

429001–429100 

|-bgcolor=#d6d6d6
| 429001 ||  || — || December 30, 2008 || Mount Lemmon || Mount Lemmon Survey || — || align=right | 2.8 km || 
|-id=002 bgcolor=#d6d6d6
| 429002 ||  || — || January 16, 2009 || Kitt Peak || Spacewatch || — || align=right | 3.5 km || 
|-id=003 bgcolor=#d6d6d6
| 429003 ||  || — || December 22, 2008 || Kitt Peak || Spacewatch || HYG || align=right | 2.7 km || 
|-id=004 bgcolor=#d6d6d6
| 429004 ||  || — || January 16, 2009 || Mount Lemmon || Mount Lemmon Survey || — || align=right | 3.3 km || 
|-id=005 bgcolor=#fefefe
| 429005 ||  || — || December 1, 2008 || Mount Lemmon || Mount Lemmon Survey || H || align=right data-sort-value="0.78" | 780 m || 
|-id=006 bgcolor=#d6d6d6
| 429006 ||  || — || January 20, 2009 || Kitt Peak || Spacewatch || THM || align=right | 2.4 km || 
|-id=007 bgcolor=#d6d6d6
| 429007 ||  || — || January 18, 2009 || Kitt Peak || Spacewatch || — || align=right | 5.9 km || 
|-id=008 bgcolor=#d6d6d6
| 429008 ||  || — || January 20, 2009 || Needville || J. Dellinger || — || align=right | 7.1 km || 
|-id=009 bgcolor=#d6d6d6
| 429009 ||  || — || December 22, 2008 || Kitt Peak || Spacewatch || — || align=right | 3.4 km || 
|-id=010 bgcolor=#d6d6d6
| 429010 ||  || — || January 15, 2009 || Kitt Peak || Spacewatch || EOS || align=right | 2.0 km || 
|-id=011 bgcolor=#d6d6d6
| 429011 ||  || — || January 1, 2009 || Kitt Peak || Spacewatch || — || align=right | 2.8 km || 
|-id=012 bgcolor=#d6d6d6
| 429012 ||  || — || January 29, 2009 || Mount Lemmon || Mount Lemmon Survey || — || align=right | 3.9 km || 
|-id=013 bgcolor=#d6d6d6
| 429013 ||  || — || January 25, 2009 || Kitt Peak || Spacewatch || — || align=right | 3.8 km || 
|-id=014 bgcolor=#d6d6d6
| 429014 ||  || — || January 25, 2009 || Kitt Peak || Spacewatch || — || align=right | 2.7 km || 
|-id=015 bgcolor=#d6d6d6
| 429015 ||  || — || November 23, 2008 || Mount Lemmon || Mount Lemmon Survey || — || align=right | 3.4 km || 
|-id=016 bgcolor=#d6d6d6
| 429016 ||  || — || January 2, 2009 || Mount Lemmon || Mount Lemmon Survey || — || align=right | 2.8 km || 
|-id=017 bgcolor=#d6d6d6
| 429017 ||  || — || January 26, 2009 || Mount Lemmon || Mount Lemmon Survey || — || align=right | 2.2 km || 
|-id=018 bgcolor=#d6d6d6
| 429018 ||  || — || October 9, 2007 || Kitt Peak || Spacewatch || — || align=right | 2.4 km || 
|-id=019 bgcolor=#d6d6d6
| 429019 ||  || — || January 29, 2009 || Kitt Peak || Spacewatch || EOS || align=right | 1.8 km || 
|-id=020 bgcolor=#d6d6d6
| 429020 ||  || — || January 31, 2009 || Mount Lemmon || Mount Lemmon Survey || — || align=right | 2.9 km || 
|-id=021 bgcolor=#d6d6d6
| 429021 ||  || — || January 29, 2009 || Kitt Peak || Spacewatch || — || align=right | 2.6 km || 
|-id=022 bgcolor=#d6d6d6
| 429022 ||  || — || December 30, 2008 || Mount Lemmon || Mount Lemmon Survey || EOS || align=right | 2.1 km || 
|-id=023 bgcolor=#d6d6d6
| 429023 ||  || — || January 31, 2009 || Kitt Peak || Spacewatch || — || align=right | 2.9 km || 
|-id=024 bgcolor=#d6d6d6
| 429024 ||  || — || January 31, 2009 || Kitt Peak || Spacewatch || — || align=right | 3.2 km || 
|-id=025 bgcolor=#d6d6d6
| 429025 ||  || — || January 31, 2009 || Kitt Peak || Spacewatch || — || align=right | 3.8 km || 
|-id=026 bgcolor=#d6d6d6
| 429026 ||  || — || January 17, 2009 || Kitt Peak || Spacewatch || — || align=right | 2.9 km || 
|-id=027 bgcolor=#d6d6d6
| 429027 ||  || — || January 31, 2009 || Kitt Peak || Spacewatch || — || align=right | 2.8 km || 
|-id=028 bgcolor=#d6d6d6
| 429028 ||  || — || January 18, 2009 || Catalina || CSS || — || align=right | 2.7 km || 
|-id=029 bgcolor=#d6d6d6
| 429029 ||  || — || January 17, 2009 || Kitt Peak || Spacewatch || — || align=right | 5.0 km || 
|-id=030 bgcolor=#d6d6d6
| 429030 ||  || — || January 18, 2009 || Kitt Peak || Spacewatch || — || align=right | 2.4 km || 
|-id=031 bgcolor=#d6d6d6
| 429031 Hannavonhoerner ||  ||  || February 11, 2009 || Calar Alto || F. Hormuth || EOS || align=right | 1.9 km || 
|-id=032 bgcolor=#d6d6d6
| 429032 Sebvonhoerner ||  ||  || February 12, 2009 || Calar Alto || F. Hormuth || — || align=right | 3.0 km || 
|-id=033 bgcolor=#d6d6d6
| 429033 Günterwendt ||  ||  || February 13, 2009 || Calar Alto || F. Hormuth || LIX || align=right | 4.5 km || 
|-id=034 bgcolor=#d6d6d6
| 429034 ||  || — || January 18, 2009 || Kitt Peak || Spacewatch || EOS || align=right | 1.8 km || 
|-id=035 bgcolor=#d6d6d6
| 429035 ||  || — || January 17, 2009 || Kitt Peak || Spacewatch || — || align=right | 3.1 km || 
|-id=036 bgcolor=#d6d6d6
| 429036 ||  || — || September 17, 2006 || Kitt Peak || Spacewatch || EOS || align=right | 2.2 km || 
|-id=037 bgcolor=#d6d6d6
| 429037 ||  || — || December 30, 2008 || Mount Lemmon || Mount Lemmon Survey || — || align=right | 2.8 km || 
|-id=038 bgcolor=#d6d6d6
| 429038 ||  || — || February 13, 2009 || Kitt Peak || Spacewatch || — || align=right | 2.6 km || 
|-id=039 bgcolor=#d6d6d6
| 429039 ||  || — || February 14, 2009 || Kitt Peak || Spacewatch || — || align=right | 3.1 km || 
|-id=040 bgcolor=#d6d6d6
| 429040 ||  || — || February 1, 2009 || Kitt Peak || Spacewatch || — || align=right | 3.3 km || 
|-id=041 bgcolor=#d6d6d6
| 429041 ||  || — || November 24, 2008 || Mount Lemmon || Mount Lemmon Survey || (3460) || align=right | 2.1 km || 
|-id=042 bgcolor=#d6d6d6
| 429042 ||  || — || January 18, 2009 || Mount Lemmon || Mount Lemmon Survey || — || align=right | 3.0 km || 
|-id=043 bgcolor=#d6d6d6
| 429043 ||  || — || October 30, 2008 || Kitt Peak || Spacewatch || — || align=right | 3.0 km || 
|-id=044 bgcolor=#d6d6d6
| 429044 ||  || — || February 2, 2009 || Catalina || CSS || — || align=right | 3.3 km || 
|-id=045 bgcolor=#d6d6d6
| 429045 ||  || — || February 16, 2009 || Dauban || F. Kugel || — || align=right | 2.5 km || 
|-id=046 bgcolor=#d6d6d6
| 429046 ||  || — || February 16, 2009 || Dauban || F. Kugel || — || align=right | 2.4 km || 
|-id=047 bgcolor=#d6d6d6
| 429047 ||  || — || February 16, 2009 || Dauban || F. Kugel || HYG || align=right | 2.5 km || 
|-id=048 bgcolor=#d6d6d6
| 429048 ||  || — || February 3, 2009 || Mount Lemmon || Mount Lemmon Survey || — || align=right | 2.8 km || 
|-id=049 bgcolor=#d6d6d6
| 429049 ||  || — || January 17, 2009 || Mount Lemmon || Mount Lemmon Survey || — || align=right | 3.4 km || 
|-id=050 bgcolor=#d6d6d6
| 429050 ||  || — || November 14, 2007 || Mount Lemmon || Mount Lemmon Survey || — || align=right | 2.7 km || 
|-id=051 bgcolor=#d6d6d6
| 429051 ||  || — || February 20, 2009 || Mount Lemmon || Mount Lemmon Survey || — || align=right | 5.5 km || 
|-id=052 bgcolor=#d6d6d6
| 429052 ||  || — || February 22, 2009 || Kitt Peak || Spacewatch || — || align=right | 4.5 km || 
|-id=053 bgcolor=#d6d6d6
| 429053 ||  || — || February 22, 2009 || Kitt Peak || Spacewatch || THM || align=right | 2.2 km || 
|-id=054 bgcolor=#d6d6d6
| 429054 ||  || — || February 22, 2009 || Kitt Peak || Spacewatch || — || align=right | 5.2 km || 
|-id=055 bgcolor=#d6d6d6
| 429055 ||  || — || February 22, 2009 || Catalina || CSS || — || align=right | 3.7 km || 
|-id=056 bgcolor=#d6d6d6
| 429056 ||  || — || February 26, 2009 || Catalina || CSS || — || align=right | 5.1 km || 
|-id=057 bgcolor=#d6d6d6
| 429057 ||  || — || February 19, 2009 || Catalina || CSS || — || align=right | 3.8 km || 
|-id=058 bgcolor=#d6d6d6
| 429058 ||  || — || February 27, 2009 || Kitt Peak || Spacewatch || — || align=right | 2.9 km || 
|-id=059 bgcolor=#d6d6d6
| 429059 ||  || — || February 19, 2009 || Kitt Peak || Spacewatch || VER || align=right | 2.5 km || 
|-id=060 bgcolor=#d6d6d6
| 429060 ||  || — || February 27, 2009 || Kitt Peak || Spacewatch || — || align=right | 3.2 km || 
|-id=061 bgcolor=#d6d6d6
| 429061 ||  || — || March 31, 2004 || Kitt Peak || Spacewatch || — || align=right | 3.5 km || 
|-id=062 bgcolor=#d6d6d6
| 429062 ||  || — || March 1, 2009 || Bisei SG Center || BATTeRS || — || align=right | 3.3 km || 
|-id=063 bgcolor=#d6d6d6
| 429063 ||  || — || March 18, 2009 || Pla D'Arguines || R. Ferrando || — || align=right | 4.1 km || 
|-id=064 bgcolor=#d6d6d6
| 429064 ||  || — || February 20, 2009 || Kitt Peak || Spacewatch || — || align=right | 3.4 km || 
|-id=065 bgcolor=#d6d6d6
| 429065 ||  || — || January 16, 2009 || Kitt Peak || Spacewatch || — || align=right | 3.7 km || 
|-id=066 bgcolor=#d6d6d6
| 429066 ||  || — || February 28, 2009 || Kitt Peak || Spacewatch || EOS || align=right | 2.4 km || 
|-id=067 bgcolor=#d6d6d6
| 429067 ||  || — || March 29, 2009 || Socorro || LINEAR || — || align=right | 4.3 km || 
|-id=068 bgcolor=#fefefe
| 429068 ||  || — || April 17, 2009 || Kitt Peak || Spacewatch || — || align=right data-sort-value="0.61" | 610 m || 
|-id=069 bgcolor=#fefefe
| 429069 ||  || — || April 19, 2009 || Kitt Peak || Spacewatch || — || align=right data-sort-value="0.75" | 750 m || 
|-id=070 bgcolor=#fefefe
| 429070 ||  || — || April 27, 2009 || Tzec Maun || L. Elenin || — || align=right data-sort-value="0.79" | 790 m || 
|-id=071 bgcolor=#fefefe
| 429071 ||  || — || April 29, 2009 || Kitt Peak || Spacewatch || — || align=right data-sort-value="0.71" | 710 m || 
|-id=072 bgcolor=#fefefe
| 429072 ||  || — || May 29, 2009 || Mount Lemmon || Mount Lemmon Survey || — || align=right data-sort-value="0.64" | 640 m || 
|-id=073 bgcolor=#FFC2E0
| 429073 ||  || — || July 13, 2009 || Cerro Burek || Alianza S4 Obs. || AMO +1kmcritical || align=right | 2.5 km || 
|-id=074 bgcolor=#fefefe
| 429074 ||  || — || October 20, 2006 || Mount Lemmon || Mount Lemmon Survey || — || align=right | 1.0 km || 
|-id=075 bgcolor=#fefefe
| 429075 ||  || — || July 28, 2009 || Catalina || CSS || — || align=right data-sort-value="0.84" | 840 m || 
|-id=076 bgcolor=#fefefe
| 429076 ||  || — || July 28, 2009 || Catalina || CSS || — || align=right data-sort-value="0.87" | 870 m || 
|-id=077 bgcolor=#E9E9E9
| 429077 ||  || — || August 15, 2009 || Kitt Peak || Spacewatch || — || align=right | 1.3 km || 
|-id=078 bgcolor=#E9E9E9
| 429078 ||  || — || August 15, 2009 || Kitt Peak || Spacewatch || — || align=right | 1.2 km || 
|-id=079 bgcolor=#fefefe
| 429079 ||  || — || August 16, 2009 || La Sagra || OAM Obs. || — || align=right data-sort-value="0.76" | 760 m || 
|-id=080 bgcolor=#fefefe
| 429080 ||  || — || August 27, 2009 || Catalina || CSS || — || align=right data-sort-value="0.82" | 820 m || 
|-id=081 bgcolor=#E9E9E9
| 429081 ||  || — || October 4, 2005 || Catalina || CSS || MAR || align=right | 1.1 km || 
|-id=082 bgcolor=#E9E9E9
| 429082 ||  || — || September 12, 2009 || Kitt Peak || Spacewatch || — || align=right data-sort-value="0.77" | 770 m || 
|-id=083 bgcolor=#C2FFFF
| 429083 ||  || — || September 12, 2009 || Kitt Peak || Spacewatch || L4 || align=right | 8.8 km || 
|-id=084 bgcolor=#E9E9E9
| 429084 Dietrichrex ||  ||  || September 13, 2009 || ESA OGS || M. Busch, R. Kresken || MAR || align=right | 1.1 km || 
|-id=085 bgcolor=#E9E9E9
| 429085 ||  || — || September 14, 2009 || Kitt Peak || Spacewatch || — || align=right | 1.3 km || 
|-id=086 bgcolor=#fefefe
| 429086 ||  || — || September 15, 2009 || Kitt Peak || Spacewatch || — || align=right | 1.1 km || 
|-id=087 bgcolor=#E9E9E9
| 429087 ||  || — || September 15, 2009 || Kitt Peak || Spacewatch || — || align=right | 1.2 km || 
|-id=088 bgcolor=#fefefe
| 429088 ||  || — || September 15, 2009 || Kitt Peak || Spacewatch || — || align=right data-sort-value="0.92" | 920 m || 
|-id=089 bgcolor=#E9E9E9
| 429089 ||  || — || September 15, 2009 || Kitt Peak || Spacewatch || — || align=right data-sort-value="0.83" | 830 m || 
|-id=090 bgcolor=#E9E9E9
| 429090 ||  || — || September 15, 2009 || Kitt Peak || Spacewatch || — || align=right | 1.4 km || 
|-id=091 bgcolor=#E9E9E9
| 429091 ||  || — || September 15, 2009 || Kitt Peak || Spacewatch || — || align=right | 2.0 km || 
|-id=092 bgcolor=#E9E9E9
| 429092 ||  || — || September 10, 2009 || Catalina || CSS || — || align=right | 1.5 km || 
|-id=093 bgcolor=#E9E9E9
| 429093 ||  || — || September 15, 2009 || Kitt Peak || Spacewatch || — || align=right | 2.0 km || 
|-id=094 bgcolor=#FFC2E0
| 429094 ||  || — || September 18, 2009 || Siding Spring || SSS || APOPHA || align=right data-sort-value="0.35" | 350 m || 
|-id=095 bgcolor=#C2FFFF
| 429095 ||  || — || September 16, 2009 || Kitt Peak || Spacewatch || L4 || align=right | 7.3 km || 
|-id=096 bgcolor=#fefefe
| 429096 ||  || — || September 16, 2009 || Mount Lemmon || Mount Lemmon Survey || — || align=right data-sort-value="0.85" | 850 m || 
|-id=097 bgcolor=#E9E9E9
| 429097 ||  || — || September 22, 2009 || Taunus || S. Karge, U. Zimmer || — || align=right | 1.7 km || 
|-id=098 bgcolor=#fefefe
| 429098 ||  || — || September 22, 2009 || Bergisch Gladbach || W. Bickel || — || align=right | 1.2 km || 
|-id=099 bgcolor=#fefefe
| 429099 ||  || — || September 1, 2005 || Kitt Peak || Spacewatch || V || align=right data-sort-value="0.55" | 550 m || 
|-id=100 bgcolor=#E9E9E9
| 429100 ||  || — || September 16, 2009 || Kitt Peak || Spacewatch || — || align=right | 1.3 km || 
|}

429101–429200 

|-bgcolor=#E9E9E9
| 429101 ||  || — || September 16, 2009 || Kitt Peak || Spacewatch || — || align=right | 2.1 km || 
|-id=102 bgcolor=#E9E9E9
| 429102 ||  || — || August 18, 2009 || Catalina || CSS || (1547) || align=right | 1.9 km || 
|-id=103 bgcolor=#fefefe
| 429103 ||  || — || September 17, 2009 || Kitt Peak || Spacewatch || — || align=right | 1.0 km || 
|-id=104 bgcolor=#E9E9E9
| 429104 ||  || — || September 17, 2009 || Kitt Peak || Spacewatch || — || align=right | 1.2 km || 
|-id=105 bgcolor=#fefefe
| 429105 ||  || — || August 17, 2009 || Kitt Peak || Spacewatch || — || align=right data-sort-value="0.82" | 820 m || 
|-id=106 bgcolor=#E9E9E9
| 429106 ||  || — || October 13, 2005 || Kitt Peak || Spacewatch || — || align=right | 1.2 km || 
|-id=107 bgcolor=#E9E9E9
| 429107 ||  || — || September 18, 2009 || Kitt Peak || Spacewatch || — || align=right | 1.3 km || 
|-id=108 bgcolor=#fefefe
| 429108 ||  || — || August 16, 2009 || Kitt Peak || Spacewatch || — || align=right data-sort-value="0.62" | 620 m || 
|-id=109 bgcolor=#E9E9E9
| 429109 ||  || — || September 14, 2009 || Socorro || LINEAR || — || align=right | 2.3 km || 
|-id=110 bgcolor=#E9E9E9
| 429110 ||  || — || September 21, 2009 || Catalina || CSS || JUN || align=right | 1.0 km || 
|-id=111 bgcolor=#E9E9E9
| 429111 ||  || — || September 11, 2009 || Catalina || CSS || — || align=right | 2.1 km || 
|-id=112 bgcolor=#E9E9E9
| 429112 ||  || — || September 22, 2009 || Kitt Peak || Spacewatch || (5) || align=right data-sort-value="0.74" | 740 m || 
|-id=113 bgcolor=#C2FFFF
| 429113 ||  || — || September 22, 2009 || Kitt Peak || Spacewatch || L4 || align=right | 11 km || 
|-id=114 bgcolor=#E9E9E9
| 429114 ||  || — || September 22, 2009 || Kitt Peak || Spacewatch || — || align=right | 1.5 km || 
|-id=115 bgcolor=#fefefe
| 429115 ||  || — || July 11, 2005 || Kitt Peak || Spacewatch || — || align=right data-sort-value="0.69" | 690 m || 
|-id=116 bgcolor=#E9E9E9
| 429116 ||  || — || September 25, 2009 || Kitt Peak || Spacewatch || — || align=right | 1.2 km || 
|-id=117 bgcolor=#fefefe
| 429117 ||  || — || August 2, 2009 || Siding Spring || SSS || — || align=right | 1.2 km || 
|-id=118 bgcolor=#fefefe
| 429118 ||  || — || September 21, 2009 || La Sagra || OAM Obs. || — || align=right | 1.2 km || 
|-id=119 bgcolor=#E9E9E9
| 429119 ||  || — || September 23, 2009 || Mount Lemmon || Mount Lemmon Survey || — || align=right data-sort-value="0.76" | 760 m || 
|-id=120 bgcolor=#E9E9E9
| 429120 Mikhaillavrov ||  ||  || September 23, 2009 || Zelenchukskaya || T. V. Kryachko || — || align=right | 1.5 km || 
|-id=121 bgcolor=#E9E9E9
| 429121 ||  || — || September 25, 2009 || Kitt Peak || Spacewatch || — || align=right data-sort-value="0.81" | 810 m || 
|-id=122 bgcolor=#E9E9E9
| 429122 ||  || — || September 27, 2009 || Kitt Peak || Spacewatch || — || align=right | 1.1 km || 
|-id=123 bgcolor=#E9E9E9
| 429123 ||  || — || September 28, 2009 || Catalina || CSS || — || align=right data-sort-value="0.90" | 900 m || 
|-id=124 bgcolor=#fefefe
| 429124 ||  || — || August 16, 2009 || Kitt Peak || Spacewatch || V || align=right data-sort-value="0.66" | 660 m || 
|-id=125 bgcolor=#fefefe
| 429125 ||  || — || August 18, 2009 || Catalina || CSS || — || align=right | 1.9 km || 
|-id=126 bgcolor=#E9E9E9
| 429126 ||  || — || September 20, 2009 || Kitt Peak || Spacewatch || EUN || align=right | 1.3 km || 
|-id=127 bgcolor=#E9E9E9
| 429127 ||  || — || September 21, 2009 || Kitt Peak || Spacewatch || — || align=right | 1.5 km || 
|-id=128 bgcolor=#E9E9E9
| 429128 ||  || — || September 21, 2009 || Catalina || CSS || — || align=right | 2.6 km || 
|-id=129 bgcolor=#E9E9E9
| 429129 ||  || — || September 26, 2009 || Kitt Peak || Spacewatch || — || align=right | 1.7 km || 
|-id=130 bgcolor=#E9E9E9
| 429130 ||  || — || September 19, 2009 || Kitt Peak || Spacewatch || — || align=right data-sort-value="0.71" | 710 m || 
|-id=131 bgcolor=#E9E9E9
| 429131 ||  || — || September 20, 2009 || Mount Lemmon || Mount Lemmon Survey || — || align=right | 3.2 km || 
|-id=132 bgcolor=#C2FFFF
| 429132 ||  || — || September 23, 2009 || Mount Lemmon || Mount Lemmon Survey || L4 || align=right | 8.0 km || 
|-id=133 bgcolor=#E9E9E9
| 429133 ||  || — || September 28, 2009 || Kitt Peak || Spacewatch || — || align=right | 2.1 km || 
|-id=134 bgcolor=#E9E9E9
| 429134 ||  || — || October 11, 2009 || Mount Lemmon || Mount Lemmon Survey || — || align=right | 1.3 km || 
|-id=135 bgcolor=#E9E9E9
| 429135 ||  || — || September 23, 2009 || Mount Lemmon || Mount Lemmon Survey || — || align=right | 1.9 km || 
|-id=136 bgcolor=#E9E9E9
| 429136 Corsali ||  ||  || October 13, 2009 || Vallemare di Borbona || V. S. Casulli || — || align=right data-sort-value="0.63" | 630 m || 
|-id=137 bgcolor=#E9E9E9
| 429137 ||  || — || October 12, 2009 || La Sagra || OAM Obs. || — || align=right | 1.8 km || 
|-id=138 bgcolor=#fefefe
| 429138 ||  || — || October 14, 2009 || Catalina || CSS || V || align=right data-sort-value="0.76" | 760 m || 
|-id=139 bgcolor=#E9E9E9
| 429139 ||  || — || September 27, 2009 || Catalina || CSS || — || align=right | 2.4 km || 
|-id=140 bgcolor=#E9E9E9
| 429140 ||  || — || October 13, 2009 || La Sagra || OAM Obs. || — || align=right | 2.9 km || 
|-id=141 bgcolor=#E9E9E9
| 429141 ||  || — || November 6, 2005 || Mount Lemmon || Mount Lemmon Survey || — || align=right | 1.2 km || 
|-id=142 bgcolor=#E9E9E9
| 429142 ||  || — || October 18, 2009 || Mount Lemmon || Mount Lemmon Survey || — || align=right | 1.3 km || 
|-id=143 bgcolor=#E9E9E9
| 429143 ||  || — || October 21, 2009 || Mount Lemmon || Mount Lemmon Survey || — || align=right | 1.8 km || 
|-id=144 bgcolor=#E9E9E9
| 429144 ||  || — || October 18, 2009 || Mount Lemmon || Mount Lemmon Survey || KON || align=right | 1.7 km || 
|-id=145 bgcolor=#E9E9E9
| 429145 ||  || — || October 23, 2009 || Mount Lemmon || Mount Lemmon Survey || — || align=right data-sort-value="0.72" | 720 m || 
|-id=146 bgcolor=#E9E9E9
| 429146 ||  || — || October 23, 2009 || Mount Lemmon || Mount Lemmon Survey || — || align=right | 1.3 km || 
|-id=147 bgcolor=#E9E9E9
| 429147 ||  || — || September 30, 2009 || Mount Lemmon || Mount Lemmon Survey || ADE || align=right | 1.9 km || 
|-id=148 bgcolor=#E9E9E9
| 429148 ||  || — || September 28, 2009 || Catalina || CSS || — || align=right | 1.3 km || 
|-id=149 bgcolor=#E9E9E9
| 429149 ||  || — || September 19, 2009 || Mount Lemmon || Mount Lemmon Survey || — || align=right | 1.4 km || 
|-id=150 bgcolor=#E9E9E9
| 429150 ||  || — || October 25, 2009 || Mount Lemmon || Mount Lemmon Survey || — || align=right | 1.4 km || 
|-id=151 bgcolor=#E9E9E9
| 429151 ||  || — || September 19, 2009 || Mount Lemmon || Mount Lemmon Survey || — || align=right data-sort-value="0.91" | 910 m || 
|-id=152 bgcolor=#E9E9E9
| 429152 ||  || — || September 21, 2009 || Mount Lemmon || Mount Lemmon Survey || — || align=right | 1.5 km || 
|-id=153 bgcolor=#C2FFFF
| 429153 ||  || — || September 12, 2009 || Kitt Peak || Spacewatch || L4 || align=right | 6.5 km || 
|-id=154 bgcolor=#fefefe
| 429154 ||  || — || October 23, 2009 || Mount Lemmon || Mount Lemmon Survey || NYS || align=right data-sort-value="0.63" | 630 m || 
|-id=155 bgcolor=#fefefe
| 429155 ||  || — || September 16, 2009 || Catalina || CSS || — || align=right | 1.2 km || 
|-id=156 bgcolor=#E9E9E9
| 429156 ||  || — || September 20, 2009 || Mount Lemmon || Mount Lemmon Survey || — || align=right data-sort-value="0.85" | 850 m || 
|-id=157 bgcolor=#E9E9E9
| 429157 ||  || — || October 24, 2009 || Socorro || LINEAR || (1547) || align=right | 2.2 km || 
|-id=158 bgcolor=#E9E9E9
| 429158 ||  || — || September 15, 2009 || Kitt Peak || Spacewatch || — || align=right | 1.5 km || 
|-id=159 bgcolor=#E9E9E9
| 429159 ||  || — || October 25, 2009 || Kitt Peak || Spacewatch || — || align=right | 1.4 km || 
|-id=160 bgcolor=#fefefe
| 429160 ||  || — || October 23, 2009 || Kitt Peak || Spacewatch || — || align=right data-sort-value="0.82" | 820 m || 
|-id=161 bgcolor=#E9E9E9
| 429161 ||  || — || October 2, 2009 || Mount Lemmon || Mount Lemmon Survey || — || align=right data-sort-value="0.90" | 900 m || 
|-id=162 bgcolor=#E9E9E9
| 429162 ||  || — || November 9, 2009 || Socorro || LINEAR || — || align=right | 1.9 km || 
|-id=163 bgcolor=#E9E9E9
| 429163 ||  || — || November 8, 2009 || Mount Lemmon || Mount Lemmon Survey || — || align=right | 2.3 km || 
|-id=164 bgcolor=#fefefe
| 429164 ||  || — || November 9, 2009 || Mount Lemmon || Mount Lemmon Survey || NYS || align=right data-sort-value="0.70" | 700 m || 
|-id=165 bgcolor=#E9E9E9
| 429165 ||  || — || November 9, 2009 || Mount Lemmon || Mount Lemmon Survey || — || align=right | 1.7 km || 
|-id=166 bgcolor=#E9E9E9
| 429166 ||  || — || November 8, 2009 || Kitt Peak || Spacewatch || — || align=right | 1.9 km || 
|-id=167 bgcolor=#E9E9E9
| 429167 ||  || — || November 9, 2009 || Mount Lemmon || Mount Lemmon Survey || — || align=right | 1.1 km || 
|-id=168 bgcolor=#E9E9E9
| 429168 ||  || — || November 15, 2009 || Catalina || CSS || — || align=right | 1.2 km || 
|-id=169 bgcolor=#fefefe
| 429169 ||  || — || October 24, 2009 || Kitt Peak || Spacewatch || SUL || align=right | 2.0 km || 
|-id=170 bgcolor=#E9E9E9
| 429170 ||  || — || September 28, 2009 || Mount Lemmon || Mount Lemmon Survey || — || align=right | 2.6 km || 
|-id=171 bgcolor=#E9E9E9
| 429171 ||  || — || November 9, 2009 || Kitt Peak || Spacewatch || — || align=right | 1.6 km || 
|-id=172 bgcolor=#E9E9E9
| 429172 ||  || — || September 20, 2009 || Mount Lemmon || Mount Lemmon Survey || — || align=right | 2.4 km || 
|-id=173 bgcolor=#E9E9E9
| 429173 ||  || — || November 9, 2009 || Catalina || CSS || — || align=right | 1.4 km || 
|-id=174 bgcolor=#fefefe
| 429174 ||  || — || November 11, 2009 || Kitt Peak || Spacewatch || — || align=right data-sort-value="0.88" | 880 m || 
|-id=175 bgcolor=#E9E9E9
| 429175 ||  || — || November 13, 2009 || La Sagra || OAM Obs. || — || align=right | 1.4 km || 
|-id=176 bgcolor=#E9E9E9
| 429176 ||  || — || November 15, 2009 || Catalina || CSS || — || align=right data-sort-value="0.85" | 850 m || 
|-id=177 bgcolor=#E9E9E9
| 429177 ||  || — || September 20, 2009 || Mount Lemmon || Mount Lemmon Survey || — || align=right | 1.3 km || 
|-id=178 bgcolor=#E9E9E9
| 429178 ||  || — || November 11, 2009 || Kitt Peak || Spacewatch || — || align=right data-sort-value="0.88" | 880 m || 
|-id=179 bgcolor=#E9E9E9
| 429179 ||  || — || September 22, 2009 || Mount Lemmon || Mount Lemmon Survey || — || align=right | 1.9 km || 
|-id=180 bgcolor=#fefefe
| 429180 ||  || — || November 3, 2005 || Mount Lemmon || Mount Lemmon Survey || — || align=right data-sort-value="0.93" | 930 m || 
|-id=181 bgcolor=#E9E9E9
| 429181 ||  || — || November 9, 2009 || Mount Lemmon || Mount Lemmon Survey || — || align=right | 2.2 km || 
|-id=182 bgcolor=#E9E9E9
| 429182 ||  || — || November 10, 2009 || Kitt Peak || Spacewatch || — || align=right | 2.5 km || 
|-id=183 bgcolor=#E9E9E9
| 429183 ||  || — || November 8, 2009 || Kitt Peak || Spacewatch || (5) || align=right data-sort-value="0.84" | 840 m || 
|-id=184 bgcolor=#E9E9E9
| 429184 ||  || — || October 12, 2009 || Mount Lemmon || Mount Lemmon Survey || — || align=right | 2.4 km || 
|-id=185 bgcolor=#E9E9E9
| 429185 ||  || — || November 16, 2009 || Mount Lemmon || Mount Lemmon Survey || — || align=right | 2.1 km || 
|-id=186 bgcolor=#E9E9E9
| 429186 ||  || — || November 8, 2009 || Kitt Peak || Spacewatch || — || align=right | 1.4 km || 
|-id=187 bgcolor=#E9E9E9
| 429187 ||  || — || December 21, 2005 || Kitt Peak || Spacewatch || — || align=right | 1.3 km || 
|-id=188 bgcolor=#E9E9E9
| 429188 ||  || — || November 8, 2009 || Kitt Peak || Spacewatch || — || align=right | 2.2 km || 
|-id=189 bgcolor=#E9E9E9
| 429189 ||  || — || September 20, 2009 || Mount Lemmon || Mount Lemmon Survey || — || align=right data-sort-value="0.89" | 890 m || 
|-id=190 bgcolor=#E9E9E9
| 429190 ||  || — || September 30, 2009 || Mount Lemmon || Mount Lemmon Survey || EUN || align=right | 1.2 km || 
|-id=191 bgcolor=#E9E9E9
| 429191 ||  || — || November 9, 2009 || Catalina || CSS || MRX || align=right | 1.0 km || 
|-id=192 bgcolor=#FA8072
| 429192 ||  || — || November 17, 2009 || Catalina || CSS || — || align=right | 1.4 km || 
|-id=193 bgcolor=#E9E9E9
| 429193 ||  || — || November 18, 2009 || Kitt Peak || Spacewatch || EUN || align=right | 1.4 km || 
|-id=194 bgcolor=#E9E9E9
| 429194 ||  || — || November 19, 2009 || Kitt Peak || Spacewatch || — || align=right data-sort-value="0.75" | 750 m || 
|-id=195 bgcolor=#E9E9E9
| 429195 ||  || — || November 19, 2009 || Kitt Peak || Spacewatch || — || align=right | 1.9 km || 
|-id=196 bgcolor=#E9E9E9
| 429196 ||  || — || November 19, 2009 || Kitt Peak || Spacewatch || — || align=right | 2.5 km || 
|-id=197 bgcolor=#E9E9E9
| 429197 ||  || — || November 9, 2009 || Catalina || CSS || — || align=right | 2.7 km || 
|-id=198 bgcolor=#E9E9E9
| 429198 ||  || — || October 14, 2009 || Mount Lemmon || Mount Lemmon Survey || EUN || align=right | 1.2 km || 
|-id=199 bgcolor=#E9E9E9
| 429199 ||  || — || November 8, 2009 || Kitt Peak || Spacewatch || MRX || align=right data-sort-value="0.79" | 790 m || 
|-id=200 bgcolor=#E9E9E9
| 429200 ||  || — || March 19, 2007 || Catalina || CSS || RAF || align=right data-sort-value="0.96" | 960 m || 
|}

429201–429300 

|-bgcolor=#E9E9E9
| 429201 ||  || — || November 20, 2009 || Kitt Peak || Spacewatch || — || align=right | 1.7 km || 
|-id=202 bgcolor=#E9E9E9
| 429202 ||  || — || November 9, 2009 || Kitt Peak || Spacewatch || — || align=right | 2.0 km || 
|-id=203 bgcolor=#E9E9E9
| 429203 ||  || — || November 22, 2009 || Kitt Peak || Spacewatch || — || align=right | 1.4 km || 
|-id=204 bgcolor=#E9E9E9
| 429204 ||  || — || November 22, 2009 || Kitt Peak || Spacewatch || — || align=right | 2.1 km || 
|-id=205 bgcolor=#E9E9E9
| 429205 ||  || — || November 24, 2009 || Mount Lemmon || Mount Lemmon Survey || — || align=right data-sort-value="0.97" | 970 m || 
|-id=206 bgcolor=#E9E9E9
| 429206 ||  || — || November 29, 2005 || Kitt Peak || Spacewatch || — || align=right data-sort-value="0.92" | 920 m || 
|-id=207 bgcolor=#E9E9E9
| 429207 ||  || — || September 21, 2009 || Mount Lemmon || Mount Lemmon Survey || — || align=right | 1.6 km || 
|-id=208 bgcolor=#E9E9E9
| 429208 ||  || — || November 18, 2009 || Mount Lemmon || Mount Lemmon Survey || MRX || align=right | 1.0 km || 
|-id=209 bgcolor=#E9E9E9
| 429209 ||  || — || November 25, 2009 || Catalina || CSS || — || align=right | 2.8 km || 
|-id=210 bgcolor=#E9E9E9
| 429210 ||  || — || October 22, 2009 || Mount Lemmon || Mount Lemmon Survey || — || align=right | 1.2 km || 
|-id=211 bgcolor=#E9E9E9
| 429211 ||  || — || April 15, 2007 || Kitt Peak || Spacewatch || WIT || align=right data-sort-value="0.99" | 990 m || 
|-id=212 bgcolor=#fefefe
| 429212 ||  || — || October 27, 2009 || Kitt Peak || Spacewatch || — || align=right data-sort-value="0.89" | 890 m || 
|-id=213 bgcolor=#E9E9E9
| 429213 ||  || — || October 12, 2009 || Mount Lemmon || Mount Lemmon Survey || — || align=right | 2.1 km || 
|-id=214 bgcolor=#E9E9E9
| 429214 ||  || — || January 22, 2006 || Mount Lemmon || Mount Lemmon Survey || — || align=right | 1.6 km || 
|-id=215 bgcolor=#E9E9E9
| 429215 ||  || — || November 24, 2009 || Kitt Peak || Spacewatch || — || align=right | 2.5 km || 
|-id=216 bgcolor=#E9E9E9
| 429216 ||  || — || November 23, 2009 || Mount Lemmon || Mount Lemmon Survey || — || align=right | 2.9 km || 
|-id=217 bgcolor=#E9E9E9
| 429217 ||  || — || November 23, 2009 || Kitt Peak || Spacewatch || — || align=right | 2.7 km || 
|-id=218 bgcolor=#E9E9E9
| 429218 ||  || — || September 28, 2009 || Kitt Peak || Spacewatch || — || align=right | 1.9 km || 
|-id=219 bgcolor=#E9E9E9
| 429219 ||  || — || December 15, 2009 || Mount Lemmon || Mount Lemmon Survey || — || align=right | 2.6 km || 
|-id=220 bgcolor=#E9E9E9
| 429220 ||  || — || December 10, 2009 || Mount Lemmon || Mount Lemmon Survey || — || align=right | 1.7 km || 
|-id=221 bgcolor=#E9E9E9
| 429221 ||  || — || December 12, 2009 || Socorro || LINEAR || — || align=right | 3.5 km || 
|-id=222 bgcolor=#E9E9E9
| 429222 ||  || — || December 18, 2009 || Mount Lemmon || Mount Lemmon Survey || — || align=right | 2.4 km || 
|-id=223 bgcolor=#E9E9E9
| 429223 ||  || — || December 18, 2009 || Mount Lemmon || Mount Lemmon Survey || — || align=right | 1.4 km || 
|-id=224 bgcolor=#d6d6d6
| 429224 ||  || — || December 19, 2009 || Mount Lemmon || Mount Lemmon Survey || — || align=right | 2.3 km || 
|-id=225 bgcolor=#E9E9E9
| 429225 ||  || — || December 16, 2009 || Socorro || LINEAR || — || align=right | 2.9 km || 
|-id=226 bgcolor=#E9E9E9
| 429226 ||  || — || December 18, 2009 || Kitt Peak || Spacewatch || DOR || align=right | 2.3 km || 
|-id=227 bgcolor=#E9E9E9
| 429227 ||  || — || November 17, 2009 || Mount Lemmon || Mount Lemmon Survey || — || align=right | 2.2 km || 
|-id=228 bgcolor=#E9E9E9
| 429228 ||  || — || December 19, 2009 || Kitt Peak || Spacewatch || AGN || align=right | 1.2 km || 
|-id=229 bgcolor=#d6d6d6
| 429229 ||  || — || March 10, 2005 || Catalina || CSS || — || align=right | 3.3 km || 
|-id=230 bgcolor=#E9E9E9
| 429230 ||  || — || January 7, 2010 || Kitt Peak || Spacewatch || — || align=right | 2.1 km || 
|-id=231 bgcolor=#E9E9E9
| 429231 ||  || — || January 5, 2010 || Kitt Peak || Spacewatch || — || align=right | 2.5 km || 
|-id=232 bgcolor=#E9E9E9
| 429232 ||  || — || January 6, 2010 || Kitt Peak || Spacewatch || — || align=right | 1.7 km || 
|-id=233 bgcolor=#E9E9E9
| 429233 ||  || — || January 6, 2010 || Kitt Peak || Spacewatch || DOR || align=right | 2.7 km || 
|-id=234 bgcolor=#E9E9E9
| 429234 ||  || — || December 17, 2009 || Kitt Peak || Spacewatch || — || align=right | 2.7 km || 
|-id=235 bgcolor=#d6d6d6
| 429235 ||  || — || January 8, 2010 || Kitt Peak || Spacewatch || — || align=right | 3.7 km || 
|-id=236 bgcolor=#E9E9E9
| 429236 ||  || — || December 19, 2009 || Kitt Peak || Spacewatch || — || align=right | 1.8 km || 
|-id=237 bgcolor=#E9E9E9
| 429237 ||  || — || January 6, 2010 || Catalina || CSS || DOR || align=right | 2.7 km || 
|-id=238 bgcolor=#E9E9E9
| 429238 ||  || — || December 20, 2009 || Kitt Peak || Spacewatch || — || align=right | 1.5 km || 
|-id=239 bgcolor=#E9E9E9
| 429239 ||  || — || January 8, 2010 || Catalina || CSS || EUN || align=right | 2.5 km || 
|-id=240 bgcolor=#E9E9E9
| 429240 ||  || — || January 14, 2010 || Gnosca || S. Sposetti || — || align=right | 2.6 km || 
|-id=241 bgcolor=#E9E9E9
| 429241 ||  || — || January 12, 2010 || Catalina || CSS || — || align=right | 2.3 km || 
|-id=242 bgcolor=#d6d6d6
| 429242 ||  || — || October 7, 2007 || Mount Lemmon || Mount Lemmon Survey || — || align=right | 5.1 km || 
|-id=243 bgcolor=#d6d6d6
| 429243 ||  || — || January 8, 2010 || WISE || WISE || — || align=right | 3.0 km || 
|-id=244 bgcolor=#d6d6d6
| 429244 ||  || — || January 8, 2010 || WISE || WISE || — || align=right | 5.3 km || 
|-id=245 bgcolor=#d6d6d6
| 429245 ||  || — || January 12, 2010 || WISE || WISE || — || align=right | 4.0 km || 
|-id=246 bgcolor=#d6d6d6
| 429246 ||  || — || January 12, 2010 || WISE || WISE || — || align=right | 4.4 km || 
|-id=247 bgcolor=#d6d6d6
| 429247 ||  || — || January 12, 2010 || WISE || WISE || — || align=right | 4.3 km || 
|-id=248 bgcolor=#d6d6d6
| 429248 ||  || — || January 14, 2010 || WISE || WISE || — || align=right | 6.1 km || 
|-id=249 bgcolor=#d6d6d6
| 429249 ||  || — || March 17, 2004 || Kitt Peak || Spacewatch || — || align=right | 3.3 km || 
|-id=250 bgcolor=#d6d6d6
| 429250 ||  || — || January 17, 2010 || WISE || WISE || — || align=right | 4.1 km || 
|-id=251 bgcolor=#d6d6d6
| 429251 ||  || — || January 17, 2010 || WISE || WISE || — || align=right | 4.1 km || 
|-id=252 bgcolor=#d6d6d6
| 429252 ||  || — || January 18, 2010 || WISE || WISE || — || align=right | 2.7 km || 
|-id=253 bgcolor=#d6d6d6
| 429253 ||  || — || January 21, 2010 || WISE || WISE || — || align=right | 4.5 km || 
|-id=254 bgcolor=#d6d6d6
| 429254 ||  || — || March 20, 2004 || Kitt Peak || Spacewatch || Tj (2.98) || align=right | 4.2 km || 
|-id=255 bgcolor=#d6d6d6
| 429255 ||  || — || August 21, 2006 || Kitt Peak || Spacewatch || — || align=right | 4.5 km || 
|-id=256 bgcolor=#d6d6d6
| 429256 ||  || — || January 23, 2010 || WISE || WISE || — || align=right | 3.1 km || 
|-id=257 bgcolor=#d6d6d6
| 429257 ||  || — || January 23, 2010 || WISE || WISE || — || align=right | 5.1 km || 
|-id=258 bgcolor=#d6d6d6
| 429258 ||  || — || December 30, 2008 || Mount Lemmon || Mount Lemmon Survey || — || align=right | 5.2 km || 
|-id=259 bgcolor=#d6d6d6
| 429259 ||  || — || March 17, 2004 || Kitt Peak || Spacewatch || — || align=right | 3.7 km || 
|-id=260 bgcolor=#d6d6d6
| 429260 ||  || — || October 11, 2006 || Kitt Peak || Spacewatch || — || align=right | 2.9 km || 
|-id=261 bgcolor=#d6d6d6
| 429261 ||  || — || January 25, 2010 || WISE || WISE || — || align=right | 5.0 km || 
|-id=262 bgcolor=#E9E9E9
| 429262 ||  || — || November 21, 2009 || Mount Lemmon || Mount Lemmon Survey || — || align=right | 2.3 km || 
|-id=263 bgcolor=#E9E9E9
| 429263 ||  || — || February 12, 2010 || Mayhill || A. Lowe || DOR || align=right | 2.1 km || 
|-id=264 bgcolor=#d6d6d6
| 429264 ||  || — || February 10, 2010 || WISE || WISE || — || align=right | 3.8 km || 
|-id=265 bgcolor=#d6d6d6
| 429265 ||  || — || February 10, 2010 || WISE || WISE || — || align=right | 4.6 km || 
|-id=266 bgcolor=#d6d6d6
| 429266 ||  || — || February 9, 2010 || Kitt Peak || Spacewatch || — || align=right | 2.0 km || 
|-id=267 bgcolor=#d6d6d6
| 429267 ||  || — || February 9, 2010 || Kitt Peak || Spacewatch || — || align=right | 1.9 km || 
|-id=268 bgcolor=#d6d6d6
| 429268 ||  || — || February 13, 2010 || Mount Lemmon || Mount Lemmon Survey || — || align=right | 3.8 km || 
|-id=269 bgcolor=#d6d6d6
| 429269 ||  || — || February 13, 2010 || Mount Lemmon || Mount Lemmon Survey || — || align=right | 3.6 km || 
|-id=270 bgcolor=#d6d6d6
| 429270 ||  || — || February 13, 2010 || WISE || WISE || — || align=right | 3.0 km || 
|-id=271 bgcolor=#d6d6d6
| 429271 ||  || — || February 9, 2010 || Kitt Peak || Spacewatch || THM || align=right | 2.2 km || 
|-id=272 bgcolor=#E9E9E9
| 429272 ||  || — || February 10, 2010 || Kitt Peak || Spacewatch || — || align=right | 3.2 km || 
|-id=273 bgcolor=#d6d6d6
| 429273 ||  || — || February 10, 2010 || Kitt Peak || Spacewatch || EOS || align=right | 2.1 km || 
|-id=274 bgcolor=#d6d6d6
| 429274 ||  || — || February 13, 2010 || Mount Lemmon || Mount Lemmon Survey || — || align=right | 2.4 km || 
|-id=275 bgcolor=#d6d6d6
| 429275 ||  || — || February 14, 2010 || Kitt Peak || Spacewatch || — || align=right | 4.6 km || 
|-id=276 bgcolor=#E9E9E9
| 429276 ||  || — || February 14, 2010 || Mount Lemmon || Mount Lemmon Survey || — || align=right | 2.2 km || 
|-id=277 bgcolor=#d6d6d6
| 429277 ||  || — || January 12, 2010 || Kitt Peak || Spacewatch || — || align=right | 2.6 km || 
|-id=278 bgcolor=#d6d6d6
| 429278 ||  || — || February 14, 2010 || Kitt Peak || Spacewatch || THM || align=right | 2.6 km || 
|-id=279 bgcolor=#E9E9E9
| 429279 ||  || — || December 19, 2004 || Mount Lemmon || Mount Lemmon Survey || AGN || align=right | 1.1 km || 
|-id=280 bgcolor=#d6d6d6
| 429280 ||  || — || February 15, 2010 || Kitt Peak || Spacewatch || — || align=right | 2.2 km || 
|-id=281 bgcolor=#d6d6d6
| 429281 ||  || — || February 15, 2010 || WISE || WISE || — || align=right | 3.5 km || 
|-id=282 bgcolor=#E9E9E9
| 429282 ||  || — || February 9, 2010 || Catalina || CSS || — || align=right | 4.0 km || 
|-id=283 bgcolor=#d6d6d6
| 429283 ||  || — || February 9, 2010 || Kitt Peak || Spacewatch || EOS || align=right | 1.8 km || 
|-id=284 bgcolor=#E9E9E9
| 429284 ||  || — || December 18, 2009 || Mount Lemmon || Mount Lemmon Survey || — || align=right | 2.4 km || 
|-id=285 bgcolor=#E9E9E9
| 429285 ||  || — || February 13, 2010 || Mount Lemmon || Mount Lemmon Survey || — || align=right | 2.1 km || 
|-id=286 bgcolor=#d6d6d6
| 429286 ||  || — || January 12, 2010 || Mount Lemmon || Mount Lemmon Survey || — || align=right | 3.2 km || 
|-id=287 bgcolor=#E9E9E9
| 429287 ||  || — || February 14, 2010 || Catalina || CSS || — || align=right | 2.2 km || 
|-id=288 bgcolor=#E9E9E9
| 429288 ||  || — || April 2, 2006 || Kitt Peak || Spacewatch || — || align=right | 2.3 km || 
|-id=289 bgcolor=#d6d6d6
| 429289 ||  || — || February 13, 2010 || Mount Lemmon || Mount Lemmon Survey || — || align=right | 2.0 km || 
|-id=290 bgcolor=#d6d6d6
| 429290 ||  || — || December 21, 2008 || Catalina || CSS || — || align=right | 3.3 km || 
|-id=291 bgcolor=#d6d6d6
| 429291 ||  || — || February 14, 2010 || Kitt Peak || Spacewatch || — || align=right | 3.1 km || 
|-id=292 bgcolor=#d6d6d6
| 429292 ||  || — || February 9, 2010 || Kitt Peak || Spacewatch || — || align=right | 3.4 km || 
|-id=293 bgcolor=#d6d6d6
| 429293 ||  || — || February 12, 2004 || Kitt Peak || Spacewatch || — || align=right | 3.6 km || 
|-id=294 bgcolor=#d6d6d6
| 429294 ||  || — || February 10, 2010 || Kitt Peak || Spacewatch || — || align=right | 4.5 km || 
|-id=295 bgcolor=#d6d6d6
| 429295 ||  || — || February 13, 2010 || Catalina || CSS || — || align=right | 4.6 km || 
|-id=296 bgcolor=#d6d6d6
| 429296 ||  || — || September 10, 2007 || Kitt Peak || Spacewatch || — || align=right | 3.1 km || 
|-id=297 bgcolor=#d6d6d6
| 429297 ||  || — || April 16, 2004 || Kitt Peak || Spacewatch || — || align=right | 3.4 km || 
|-id=298 bgcolor=#d6d6d6
| 429298 ||  || — || February 8, 2010 || WISE || WISE || — || align=right | 3.4 km || 
|-id=299 bgcolor=#d6d6d6
| 429299 ||  || — || February 9, 2010 || WISE || WISE || — || align=right | 4.9 km || 
|-id=300 bgcolor=#d6d6d6
| 429300 ||  || — || December 19, 2009 || Kitt Peak || Spacewatch || — || align=right | 3.5 km || 
|}

429301–429400 

|-bgcolor=#d6d6d6
| 429301 ||  || — || February 17, 2010 || WISE || WISE || — || align=right | 3.6 km || 
|-id=302 bgcolor=#d6d6d6
| 429302 ||  || — || February 16, 2010 || WISE || WISE || — || align=right | 3.2 km || 
|-id=303 bgcolor=#d6d6d6
| 429303 ||  || — || October 15, 2007 || Kitt Peak || Spacewatch || — || align=right | 4.5 km || 
|-id=304 bgcolor=#d6d6d6
| 429304 ||  || — || February 16, 2010 || WISE || WISE || — || align=right | 4.4 km || 
|-id=305 bgcolor=#d6d6d6
| 429305 ||  || — || February 17, 2010 || WISE || WISE || — || align=right | 3.3 km || 
|-id=306 bgcolor=#E9E9E9
| 429306 ||  || — || February 16, 2010 || Mount Lemmon || Mount Lemmon Survey || — || align=right | 2.4 km || 
|-id=307 bgcolor=#d6d6d6
| 429307 ||  || — || February 17, 2010 || Kitt Peak || Spacewatch || — || align=right | 2.6 km || 
|-id=308 bgcolor=#d6d6d6
| 429308 ||  || — || February 17, 2010 || Kitt Peak || Spacewatch || — || align=right | 3.3 km || 
|-id=309 bgcolor=#d6d6d6
| 429309 ||  || — || February 19, 2010 || LightBuckets || LightBuckets Obs. || — || align=right | 2.6 km || 
|-id=310 bgcolor=#E9E9E9
| 429310 ||  || — || March 23, 2006 || Catalina || CSS || — || align=right | 2.9 km || 
|-id=311 bgcolor=#d6d6d6
| 429311 ||  || — || February 14, 2010 || Mount Lemmon || Mount Lemmon Survey || — || align=right | 2.5 km || 
|-id=312 bgcolor=#d6d6d6
| 429312 ||  || — || March 10, 2010 || Bergisch Gladbac || W. Bickel || Tj (2.99) || align=right | 5.2 km || 
|-id=313 bgcolor=#d6d6d6
| 429313 ||  || — || March 4, 2010 || Kitt Peak || Spacewatch || — || align=right | 2.4 km || 
|-id=314 bgcolor=#E9E9E9
| 429314 ||  || — || March 12, 2010 || Catalina || CSS || — || align=right | 2.7 km || 
|-id=315 bgcolor=#d6d6d6
| 429315 ||  || — || March 13, 2010 || Catalina || CSS || LIX || align=right | 4.0 km || 
|-id=316 bgcolor=#d6d6d6
| 429316 ||  || — || January 13, 2010 || WISE || WISE || — || align=right | 4.2 km || 
|-id=317 bgcolor=#d6d6d6
| 429317 ||  || — || March 12, 2010 || Mount Lemmon || Mount Lemmon Survey || — || align=right | 2.3 km || 
|-id=318 bgcolor=#d6d6d6
| 429318 ||  || — || March 13, 2010 || Mount Lemmon || Mount Lemmon Survey || KOR || align=right | 1.3 km || 
|-id=319 bgcolor=#d6d6d6
| 429319 ||  || — || March 13, 2010 || Mount Lemmon || Mount Lemmon Survey || — || align=right | 2.3 km || 
|-id=320 bgcolor=#d6d6d6
| 429320 ||  || — || November 19, 2008 || Kitt Peak || Spacewatch || — || align=right | 2.6 km || 
|-id=321 bgcolor=#d6d6d6
| 429321 ||  || — || March 13, 2010 || Kitt Peak || Spacewatch || — || align=right | 2.2 km || 
|-id=322 bgcolor=#d6d6d6
| 429322 ||  || — || January 14, 2010 || WISE || WISE || — || align=right | 3.3 km || 
|-id=323 bgcolor=#d6d6d6
| 429323 ||  || — || January 11, 2010 || Kitt Peak || Spacewatch || — || align=right | 4.7 km || 
|-id=324 bgcolor=#d6d6d6
| 429324 ||  || — || March 14, 2010 || Kitt Peak || Spacewatch || — || align=right | 2.8 km || 
|-id=325 bgcolor=#d6d6d6
| 429325 ||  || — || March 14, 2010 || Kitt Peak || Spacewatch || — || align=right | 3.9 km || 
|-id=326 bgcolor=#d6d6d6
| 429326 ||  || — || March 14, 2010 || Kitt Peak || Spacewatch || — || align=right | 1.9 km || 
|-id=327 bgcolor=#d6d6d6
| 429327 ||  || — || September 26, 2006 || Kitt Peak || Spacewatch || TIR || align=right | 2.5 km || 
|-id=328 bgcolor=#d6d6d6
| 429328 ||  || — || March 12, 2010 || Kitt Peak || Spacewatch || THM || align=right | 2.5 km || 
|-id=329 bgcolor=#d6d6d6
| 429329 ||  || — || March 14, 2010 || Kitt Peak || Spacewatch || — || align=right | 3.0 km || 
|-id=330 bgcolor=#d6d6d6
| 429330 ||  || — || February 16, 2010 || Catalina || CSS || — || align=right | 3.1 km || 
|-id=331 bgcolor=#d6d6d6
| 429331 ||  || — || March 13, 2010 || Catalina || CSS || NAE || align=right | 4.4 km || 
|-id=332 bgcolor=#d6d6d6
| 429332 ||  || — || March 13, 2010 || Kitt Peak || Spacewatch || — || align=right | 3.0 km || 
|-id=333 bgcolor=#d6d6d6
| 429333 ||  || — || March 14, 2010 || Kitt Peak || Spacewatch || — || align=right | 3.6 km || 
|-id=334 bgcolor=#d6d6d6
| 429334 ||  || — || March 12, 2010 || Kitt Peak || Spacewatch || — || align=right | 3.6 km || 
|-id=335 bgcolor=#d6d6d6
| 429335 ||  || — || March 14, 2010 || Kitt Peak || Spacewatch || — || align=right | 2.7 km || 
|-id=336 bgcolor=#d6d6d6
| 429336 ||  || — || March 13, 2010 || Kitt Peak || Spacewatch || THM || align=right | 3.0 km || 
|-id=337 bgcolor=#d6d6d6
| 429337 ||  || — || November 2, 2007 || Kitt Peak || Spacewatch || — || align=right | 2.8 km || 
|-id=338 bgcolor=#d6d6d6
| 429338 ||  || — || September 15, 2007 || Kitt Peak || Spacewatch || — || align=right | 3.2 km || 
|-id=339 bgcolor=#d6d6d6
| 429339 ||  || — || March 16, 2010 || Kitt Peak || Spacewatch || — || align=right | 3.0 km || 
|-id=340 bgcolor=#d6d6d6
| 429340 ||  || — || March 18, 2010 || Kitt Peak || Spacewatch || — || align=right | 3.2 km || 
|-id=341 bgcolor=#E9E9E9
| 429341 ||  || — || March 18, 2010 || Mount Lemmon || Mount Lemmon Survey || — || align=right | 2.4 km || 
|-id=342 bgcolor=#d6d6d6
| 429342 ||  || — || March 18, 2010 || Mount Lemmon || Mount Lemmon Survey || — || align=right | 2.6 km || 
|-id=343 bgcolor=#d6d6d6
| 429343 ||  || — || September 11, 2007 || Mount Lemmon || Mount Lemmon Survey || — || align=right | 2.5 km || 
|-id=344 bgcolor=#d6d6d6
| 429344 ||  || — || March 19, 2010 || Mount Lemmon || Mount Lemmon Survey || — || align=right | 3.6 km || 
|-id=345 bgcolor=#d6d6d6
| 429345 ||  || — || December 20, 2009 || Mount Lemmon || Mount Lemmon Survey || — || align=right | 3.5 km || 
|-id=346 bgcolor=#d6d6d6
| 429346 ||  || — || March 12, 2010 || Mount Lemmon || Mount Lemmon Survey || — || align=right | 2.6 km || 
|-id=347 bgcolor=#d6d6d6
| 429347 ||  || — || March 25, 2010 || Mount Lemmon || Mount Lemmon Survey || LIX || align=right | 3.8 km || 
|-id=348 bgcolor=#d6d6d6
| 429348 ||  || — || March 19, 2010 || Mount Lemmon || Mount Lemmon Survey || — || align=right | 3.5 km || 
|-id=349 bgcolor=#d6d6d6
| 429349 ||  || — || March 23, 2010 || Mount Lemmon || Mount Lemmon Survey || — || align=right | 2.8 km || 
|-id=350 bgcolor=#d6d6d6
| 429350 ||  || — || March 18, 2010 || Mount Lemmon || Mount Lemmon Survey || — || align=right | 4.4 km || 
|-id=351 bgcolor=#d6d6d6
| 429351 ||  || — || March 26, 2010 || Kitt Peak || Spacewatch || — || align=right | 2.8 km || 
|-id=352 bgcolor=#d6d6d6
| 429352 ||  || — || September 12, 2007 || Mount Lemmon || Mount Lemmon Survey || EOS || align=right | 1.6 km || 
|-id=353 bgcolor=#E9E9E9
| 429353 ||  || — || March 15, 2010 || Mount Lemmon || Mount Lemmon Survey || — || align=right | 2.7 km || 
|-id=354 bgcolor=#d6d6d6
| 429354 ||  || — || January 31, 2010 || WISE || WISE || — || align=right | 1.8 km || 
|-id=355 bgcolor=#d6d6d6
| 429355 ||  || — || September 15, 2007 || Mount Lemmon || Mount Lemmon Survey || EOS || align=right | 2.4 km || 
|-id=356 bgcolor=#d6d6d6
| 429356 ||  || — || April 8, 2010 || Catalina || CSS || — || align=right | 3.5 km || 
|-id=357 bgcolor=#fefefe
| 429357 ||  || — || April 9, 2010 || Catalina || CSS || H || align=right data-sort-value="0.59" | 590 m || 
|-id=358 bgcolor=#d6d6d6
| 429358 ||  || — || April 14, 2010 || WISE || WISE || — || align=right | 5.8 km || 
|-id=359 bgcolor=#d6d6d6
| 429359 ||  || — || April 10, 2010 || Kitt Peak || Spacewatch || — || align=right | 3.3 km || 
|-id=360 bgcolor=#d6d6d6
| 429360 ||  || — || April 4, 2010 || Kitt Peak || Spacewatch || — || align=right | 2.6 km || 
|-id=361 bgcolor=#d6d6d6
| 429361 ||  || — || January 22, 2010 || WISE || WISE || — || align=right | 3.1 km || 
|-id=362 bgcolor=#d6d6d6
| 429362 ||  || — || January 28, 2010 || WISE || WISE || — || align=right | 4.6 km || 
|-id=363 bgcolor=#d6d6d6
| 429363 ||  || — || October 10, 2007 || Kitt Peak || Spacewatch || — || align=right | 2.3 km || 
|-id=364 bgcolor=#d6d6d6
| 429364 ||  || — || March 14, 2005 || Mount Lemmon || Mount Lemmon Survey || — || align=right | 2.1 km || 
|-id=365 bgcolor=#d6d6d6
| 429365 ||  || — || April 15, 2010 || Mount Lemmon || Mount Lemmon Survey || — || align=right | 3.3 km || 
|-id=366 bgcolor=#d6d6d6
| 429366 ||  || — || September 18, 2007 || Kitt Peak || Spacewatch || EOS || align=right | 2.3 km || 
|-id=367 bgcolor=#E9E9E9
| 429367 ||  || — || January 6, 2010 || Catalina || CSS || — || align=right | 2.7 km || 
|-id=368 bgcolor=#E9E9E9
| 429368 ||  || — || January 10, 2010 || Kitt Peak || Spacewatch || — || align=right | 2.6 km || 
|-id=369 bgcolor=#d6d6d6
| 429369 ||  || — || May 4, 2010 || Kitt Peak || Spacewatch || THB || align=right | 2.7 km || 
|-id=370 bgcolor=#E9E9E9
| 429370 ||  || — || March 23, 2006 || Kitt Peak || Spacewatch || — || align=right | 2.7 km || 
|-id=371 bgcolor=#d6d6d6
| 429371 ||  || — || February 3, 2010 || WISE || WISE || — || align=right | 3.9 km || 
|-id=372 bgcolor=#d6d6d6
| 429372 ||  || — || May 13, 2010 || Mount Lemmon || Mount Lemmon Survey || — || align=right | 3.4 km || 
|-id=373 bgcolor=#d6d6d6
| 429373 ||  || — || February 9, 2010 || WISE || WISE || — || align=right | 3.0 km || 
|-id=374 bgcolor=#E9E9E9
| 429374 ||  || — || May 14, 2001 || Kitt Peak || Spacewatch || — || align=right | 3.7 km || 
|-id=375 bgcolor=#d6d6d6
| 429375 ||  || — || May 8, 2010 || Mount Lemmon || Mount Lemmon Survey || — || align=right | 2.6 km || 
|-id=376 bgcolor=#d6d6d6
| 429376 ||  || — || May 22, 2010 || Mount Lemmon || Mount Lemmon Survey || — || align=right | 4.5 km || 
|-id=377 bgcolor=#d6d6d6
| 429377 ||  || — || March 20, 2010 || Mount Lemmon || Mount Lemmon Survey || EOS || align=right | 4.5 km || 
|-id=378 bgcolor=#fefefe
| 429378 ||  || — || June 6, 2010 || WISE || WISE || — || align=right | 1.6 km || 
|-id=379 bgcolor=#d6d6d6
| 429379 ||  || — || November 24, 2008 || Mount Lemmon || Mount Lemmon Survey || THB || align=right | 2.6 km || 
|-id=380 bgcolor=#fefefe
| 429380 ||  || — || February 16, 2007 || Catalina || CSS || H || align=right data-sort-value="0.68" | 680 m || 
|-id=381 bgcolor=#d6d6d6
| 429381 ||  || — || December 30, 2007 || Kitt Peak || Spacewatch || EOS || align=right | 2.5 km || 
|-id=382 bgcolor=#FFC2E0
| 429382 ||  || — || July 8, 2010 || Kitt Peak || Spacewatch || AMO +1km || align=right data-sort-value="0.45" | 450 m || 
|-id=383 bgcolor=#d6d6d6
| 429383 ||  || — || January 29, 2010 || WISE || WISE || — || align=right | 4.8 km || 
|-id=384 bgcolor=#d6d6d6
| 429384 ||  || — || January 29, 2010 || WISE || WISE || EMA || align=right | 3.6 km || 
|-id=385 bgcolor=#d6d6d6
| 429385 ||  || — || January 31, 2010 || WISE || WISE || — || align=right | 3.9 km || 
|-id=386 bgcolor=#d6d6d6
| 429386 ||  || — || February 1, 2010 || WISE || WISE || — || align=right | 4.3 km || 
|-id=387 bgcolor=#fefefe
| 429387 ||  || — || June 16, 2010 || Kitt Peak || Spacewatch || — || align=right | 1.5 km || 
|-id=388 bgcolor=#d6d6d6
| 429388 ||  || — || November 8, 2007 || Kitt Peak || Spacewatch || THM || align=right | 2.8 km || 
|-id=389 bgcolor=#FFC2E0
| 429389 ||  || — || August 6, 2010 || Siding Spring || SSS || APOcritical || align=right data-sort-value="0.17" | 170 m || 
|-id=390 bgcolor=#fefefe
| 429390 ||  || — || December 19, 2003 || Socorro || LINEAR || — || align=right | 1.5 km || 
|-id=391 bgcolor=#fefefe
| 429391 ||  || — || August 12, 2010 || Kitt Peak || Spacewatch || — || align=right data-sort-value="0.87" | 870 m || 
|-id=392 bgcolor=#fefefe
| 429392 ||  || — || August 14, 2010 || Kitt Peak || Spacewatch || — || align=right data-sort-value="0.71" | 710 m || 
|-id=393 bgcolor=#fefefe
| 429393 ||  || — || September 1, 2010 || Socorro || LINEAR || — || align=right | 1.0 km || 
|-id=394 bgcolor=#fefefe
| 429394 ||  || — || January 13, 2008 || Kitt Peak || Spacewatch || — || align=right data-sort-value="0.48" | 480 m || 
|-id=395 bgcolor=#fefefe
| 429395 ||  || — || September 4, 2010 || Socorro || LINEAR || — || align=right data-sort-value="0.82" | 820 m || 
|-id=396 bgcolor=#fefefe
| 429396 ||  || — || August 13, 2010 || Kitt Peak || Spacewatch || — || align=right data-sort-value="0.59" | 590 m || 
|-id=397 bgcolor=#fefefe
| 429397 ||  || — || October 6, 2000 || Anderson Mesa || LONEOS || — || align=right data-sort-value="0.73" | 730 m || 
|-id=398 bgcolor=#fefefe
| 429398 ||  || — || September 19, 2003 || Campo Imperatore || CINEOS || — || align=right data-sort-value="0.76" | 760 m || 
|-id=399 bgcolor=#fefefe
| 429399 ||  || — || September 10, 2010 || Kitt Peak || Spacewatch || — || align=right data-sort-value="0.52" | 520 m || 
|-id=400 bgcolor=#fefefe
| 429400 ||  || — || November 7, 2007 || Mount Lemmon || Mount Lemmon Survey || — || align=right data-sort-value="0.81" | 810 m || 
|}

429401–429500 

|-bgcolor=#fefefe
| 429401 ||  || — || September 10, 2010 || Kitt Peak || Spacewatch || — || align=right data-sort-value="0.66" | 660 m || 
|-id=402 bgcolor=#fefefe
| 429402 ||  || — || September 8, 2010 || Kitt Peak || Spacewatch || — || align=right data-sort-value="0.82" | 820 m || 
|-id=403 bgcolor=#fefefe
| 429403 ||  || — || December 28, 2007 || Kitt Peak || Spacewatch || — || align=right data-sort-value="0.78" | 780 m || 
|-id=404 bgcolor=#fefefe
| 429404 ||  || — || November 2, 2007 || Kitt Peak || Spacewatch || — || align=right data-sort-value="0.65" | 650 m || 
|-id=405 bgcolor=#FA8072
| 429405 ||  || — || February 9, 2008 || Kitt Peak || Spacewatch || — || align=right data-sort-value="0.80" | 800 m || 
|-id=406 bgcolor=#fefefe
| 429406 ||  || — || March 4, 2008 || Mount Lemmon || Mount Lemmon Survey || — || align=right | 1.6 km || 
|-id=407 bgcolor=#fefefe
| 429407 ||  || — || December 5, 2007 || Kitt Peak || Spacewatch || — || align=right data-sort-value="0.58" | 580 m || 
|-id=408 bgcolor=#fefefe
| 429408 ||  || — || October 9, 2010 || Catalina || CSS || — || align=right data-sort-value="0.71" | 710 m || 
|-id=409 bgcolor=#fefefe
| 429409 ||  || — || October 11, 2010 || Mount Lemmon || Mount Lemmon Survey || — || align=right data-sort-value="0.94" | 940 m || 
|-id=410 bgcolor=#C2FFFF
| 429410 ||  || — || October 11, 2010 || Mount Lemmon || Mount Lemmon Survey || L4 || align=right | 7.5 km || 
|-id=411 bgcolor=#fefefe
| 429411 ||  || — || October 21, 2003 || Kitt Peak || Spacewatch || — || align=right data-sort-value="0.77" | 770 m || 
|-id=412 bgcolor=#fefefe
| 429412 ||  || — || September 16, 2010 || Mount Lemmon || Mount Lemmon Survey || — || align=right data-sort-value="0.72" | 720 m || 
|-id=413 bgcolor=#fefefe
| 429413 ||  || — || January 16, 2005 || Kitt Peak || Spacewatch || — || align=right data-sort-value="0.69" | 690 m || 
|-id=414 bgcolor=#fefefe
| 429414 ||  || — || October 9, 2010 || Catalina || CSS || — || align=right data-sort-value="0.74" | 740 m || 
|-id=415 bgcolor=#fefefe
| 429415 ||  || — || November 16, 2003 || Catalina || CSS || — || align=right | 1.0 km || 
|-id=416 bgcolor=#fefefe
| 429416 ||  || — || October 1, 2000 || Socorro || LINEAR || — || align=right data-sort-value="0.70" | 700 m || 
|-id=417 bgcolor=#fefefe
| 429417 ||  || — || January 18, 2008 || Mount Lemmon || Mount Lemmon Survey || — || align=right data-sort-value="0.75" | 750 m || 
|-id=418 bgcolor=#fefefe
| 429418 ||  || — || October 17, 2010 || Mount Lemmon || Mount Lemmon Survey || — || align=right data-sort-value="0.68" | 680 m || 
|-id=419 bgcolor=#fefefe
| 429419 ||  || — || September 6, 1999 || Kitt Peak || Spacewatch || — || align=right data-sort-value="0.69" | 690 m || 
|-id=420 bgcolor=#fefefe
| 429420 ||  || — || November 26, 2003 || Kitt Peak || Spacewatch || — || align=right data-sort-value="0.78" | 780 m || 
|-id=421 bgcolor=#fefefe
| 429421 ||  || — || February 12, 2008 || Kitt Peak || Spacewatch || — || align=right data-sort-value="0.79" | 790 m || 
|-id=422 bgcolor=#fefefe
| 429422 ||  || — || October 28, 2010 || Kitt Peak || Spacewatch || — || align=right data-sort-value="0.68" | 680 m || 
|-id=423 bgcolor=#C2FFFF
| 429423 ||  || — || October 13, 2010 || Mount Lemmon || Mount Lemmon Survey || L4 || align=right | 8.0 km || 
|-id=424 bgcolor=#fefefe
| 429424 ||  || — || December 31, 2007 || Mount Lemmon || Mount Lemmon Survey || — || align=right data-sort-value="0.57" | 570 m || 
|-id=425 bgcolor=#fefefe
| 429425 ||  || — || October 30, 2010 || Catalina || CSS || — || align=right data-sort-value="0.86" | 860 m || 
|-id=426 bgcolor=#fefefe
| 429426 ||  || — || December 30, 2007 || Kitt Peak || Spacewatch || — || align=right data-sort-value="0.73" | 730 m || 
|-id=427 bgcolor=#fefefe
| 429427 ||  || — || February 28, 2008 || Mount Lemmon || Mount Lemmon Survey || — || align=right data-sort-value="0.84" | 840 m || 
|-id=428 bgcolor=#fefefe
| 429428 ||  || — || December 19, 2007 || Mount Lemmon || Mount Lemmon Survey || — || align=right data-sort-value="0.78" | 780 m || 
|-id=429 bgcolor=#fefefe
| 429429 ||  || — || October 13, 2010 || Mount Lemmon || Mount Lemmon Survey || — || align=right data-sort-value="0.65" | 650 m || 
|-id=430 bgcolor=#fefefe
| 429430 ||  || — || October 13, 2010 || Mount Lemmon || Mount Lemmon Survey || — || align=right data-sort-value="0.64" | 640 m || 
|-id=431 bgcolor=#fefefe
| 429431 ||  || — || October 19, 2003 || Kitt Peak || Spacewatch || (2076) || align=right data-sort-value="0.76" | 760 m || 
|-id=432 bgcolor=#fefefe
| 429432 ||  || — || November 1, 2010 || Kitt Peak || Spacewatch || V || align=right data-sort-value="0.75" | 750 m || 
|-id=433 bgcolor=#fefefe
| 429433 ||  || — || August 21, 2006 || Kitt Peak || Spacewatch || — || align=right data-sort-value="0.70" | 700 m || 
|-id=434 bgcolor=#fefefe
| 429434 ||  || — || October 12, 2010 || Mount Lemmon || Mount Lemmon Survey || — || align=right data-sort-value="0.59" | 590 m || 
|-id=435 bgcolor=#fefefe
| 429435 ||  || — || November 3, 2010 || Mount Lemmon || Mount Lemmon Survey || — || align=right data-sort-value="0.57" | 570 m || 
|-id=436 bgcolor=#fefefe
| 429436 ||  || — || October 11, 2010 || Catalina || CSS || — || align=right data-sort-value="0.87" | 870 m || 
|-id=437 bgcolor=#fefefe
| 429437 ||  || — || September 22, 1995 || Kitt Peak || Spacewatch || MAS || align=right data-sort-value="0.60" | 600 m || 
|-id=438 bgcolor=#fefefe
| 429438 ||  || — || January 28, 2004 || Kitt Peak || Spacewatch || — || align=right data-sort-value="0.64" | 640 m || 
|-id=439 bgcolor=#fefefe
| 429439 ||  || — || November 19, 2003 || Kitt Peak || Spacewatch || — || align=right data-sort-value="0.69" | 690 m || 
|-id=440 bgcolor=#fefefe
| 429440 ||  || — || January 10, 1997 || Kitt Peak || Spacewatch || NYS || align=right data-sort-value="0.65" | 650 m || 
|-id=441 bgcolor=#fefefe
| 429441 ||  || — || January 12, 2008 || Mount Lemmon || Mount Lemmon Survey || — || align=right data-sort-value="0.90" | 900 m || 
|-id=442 bgcolor=#C2FFFF
| 429442 ||  || — || November 3, 2010 || Mount Lemmon || Mount Lemmon Survey || L4 || align=right | 11 km || 
|-id=443 bgcolor=#fefefe
| 429443 ||  || — || March 29, 2008 || Kitt Peak || Spacewatch || — || align=right data-sort-value="0.64" | 640 m || 
|-id=444 bgcolor=#fefefe
| 429444 ||  || — || December 18, 2007 || Mount Lemmon || Mount Lemmon Survey || — || align=right data-sort-value="0.72" | 720 m || 
|-id=445 bgcolor=#fefefe
| 429445 ||  || — || November 30, 2003 || Kitt Peak || Spacewatch || — || align=right data-sort-value="0.85" | 850 m || 
|-id=446 bgcolor=#fefefe
| 429446 ||  || — || January 14, 2008 || Kitt Peak || Spacewatch || — || align=right data-sort-value="0.69" | 690 m || 
|-id=447 bgcolor=#fefefe
| 429447 ||  || — || October 10, 1999 || Socorro || LINEAR || — || align=right data-sort-value="0.73" | 730 m || 
|-id=448 bgcolor=#fefefe
| 429448 ||  || — || December 18, 2007 || Mount Lemmon || Mount Lemmon Survey || — || align=right data-sort-value="0.54" | 540 m || 
|-id=449 bgcolor=#fefefe
| 429449 ||  || — || January 11, 2008 || Mount Lemmon || Mount Lemmon Survey || — || align=right data-sort-value="0.64" | 640 m || 
|-id=450 bgcolor=#fefefe
| 429450 ||  || — || November 11, 2007 || Mount Lemmon || Mount Lemmon Survey || — || align=right data-sort-value="0.75" | 750 m || 
|-id=451 bgcolor=#fefefe
| 429451 ||  || — || February 8, 2008 || Kitt Peak || Spacewatch || — || align=right data-sort-value="0.65" | 650 m || 
|-id=452 bgcolor=#fefefe
| 429452 ||  || — || November 10, 2010 || Kitt Peak || Spacewatch || — || align=right data-sort-value="0.73" | 730 m || 
|-id=453 bgcolor=#fefefe
| 429453 ||  || — || January 19, 2004 || Kitt Peak || Spacewatch || MAS || align=right data-sort-value="0.53" | 530 m || 
|-id=454 bgcolor=#fefefe
| 429454 ||  || — || September 25, 2006 || Kitt Peak || Spacewatch || MAS || align=right data-sort-value="0.55" | 550 m || 
|-id=455 bgcolor=#fefefe
| 429455 ||  || — || March 10, 2008 || Kitt Peak || Spacewatch || NYS || align=right data-sort-value="0.48" | 480 m || 
|-id=456 bgcolor=#fefefe
| 429456 ||  || — || October 19, 2010 || Mount Lemmon || Mount Lemmon Survey || — || align=right data-sort-value="0.80" | 800 m || 
|-id=457 bgcolor=#fefefe
| 429457 ||  || — || October 31, 2010 || Kitt Peak || Spacewatch || — || align=right data-sort-value="0.73" | 730 m || 
|-id=458 bgcolor=#fefefe
| 429458 ||  || — || July 25, 2003 || Campo Imperatore || CINEOS || — || align=right data-sort-value="0.72" | 720 m || 
|-id=459 bgcolor=#fefefe
| 429459 ||  || — || February 9, 2008 || Mount Lemmon || Mount Lemmon Survey || — || align=right data-sort-value="0.60" | 600 m || 
|-id=460 bgcolor=#fefefe
| 429460 ||  || — || November 1, 2010 || Kitt Peak || Spacewatch || — || align=right data-sort-value="0.56" | 560 m || 
|-id=461 bgcolor=#fefefe
| 429461 ||  || — || October 29, 2010 || Kitt Peak || Spacewatch || — || align=right data-sort-value="0.91" | 910 m || 
|-id=462 bgcolor=#fefefe
| 429462 ||  || — || February 28, 2008 || Kitt Peak || Spacewatch || MAS || align=right data-sort-value="0.61" | 610 m || 
|-id=463 bgcolor=#FA8072
| 429463 ||  || — || January 10, 2008 || Mount Lemmon || Mount Lemmon Survey || — || align=right data-sort-value="0.99" | 990 m || 
|-id=464 bgcolor=#fefefe
| 429464 ||  || — || December 21, 2003 || Kitt Peak || Spacewatch || MAS || align=right data-sort-value="0.53" | 530 m || 
|-id=465 bgcolor=#fefefe
| 429465 ||  || — || November 11, 2010 || Kitt Peak || Spacewatch || — || align=right data-sort-value="0.69" | 690 m || 
|-id=466 bgcolor=#fefefe
| 429466 ||  || — || October 2, 2006 || Kitt Peak || Spacewatch || NYS || align=right data-sort-value="0.44" | 440 m || 
|-id=467 bgcolor=#fefefe
| 429467 ||  || — || November 10, 2010 || Mount Lemmon || Mount Lemmon Survey || NYS || align=right data-sort-value="0.62" | 620 m || 
|-id=468 bgcolor=#fefefe
| 429468 ||  || — || November 7, 2010 || Mount Lemmon || Mount Lemmon Survey || — || align=right data-sort-value="0.82" | 820 m || 
|-id=469 bgcolor=#E9E9E9
| 429469 ||  || — || November 18, 2006 || Mount Lemmon || Mount Lemmon Survey || — || align=right data-sort-value="0.86" | 860 m || 
|-id=470 bgcolor=#fefefe
| 429470 ||  || — || October 13, 2006 || Kitt Peak || Spacewatch || — || align=right data-sort-value="0.82" | 820 m || 
|-id=471 bgcolor=#fefefe
| 429471 ||  || — || February 8, 2008 || Kitt Peak || Spacewatch || — || align=right data-sort-value="0.76" | 760 m || 
|-id=472 bgcolor=#fefefe
| 429472 ||  || — || December 19, 2003 || Socorro || LINEAR || — || align=right data-sort-value="0.87" | 870 m || 
|-id=473 bgcolor=#fefefe
| 429473 ||  || — || December 28, 2003 || Kitt Peak || Spacewatch || — || align=right data-sort-value="0.75" | 750 m || 
|-id=474 bgcolor=#fefefe
| 429474 ||  || — || November 13, 2010 || Mount Lemmon || Mount Lemmon Survey || — || align=right data-sort-value="0.81" | 810 m || 
|-id=475 bgcolor=#fefefe
| 429475 ||  || — || September 17, 2006 || Kitt Peak || Spacewatch || — || align=right data-sort-value="0.71" | 710 m || 
|-id=476 bgcolor=#fefefe
| 429476 ||  || — || December 6, 2010 || Mount Lemmon || Mount Lemmon Survey || — || align=right data-sort-value="0.87" | 870 m || 
|-id=477 bgcolor=#fefefe
| 429477 ||  || — || March 28, 2008 || Mount Lemmon || Mount Lemmon Survey || V || align=right data-sort-value="0.60" | 600 m || 
|-id=478 bgcolor=#fefefe
| 429478 ||  || — || November 10, 2006 || Kitt Peak || Spacewatch || MAS || align=right data-sort-value="0.69" | 690 m || 
|-id=479 bgcolor=#fefefe
| 429479 ||  || — || October 29, 2003 || Kitt Peak || Spacewatch || — || align=right data-sort-value="0.75" | 750 m || 
|-id=480 bgcolor=#fefefe
| 429480 ||  || — || January 8, 2011 || Mount Lemmon || Mount Lemmon Survey || — || align=right | 1.0 km || 
|-id=481 bgcolor=#E9E9E9
| 429481 ||  || — || December 26, 2006 || Kitt Peak || Spacewatch || — || align=right data-sort-value="0.72" | 720 m || 
|-id=482 bgcolor=#fefefe
| 429482 ||  || — || September 17, 2009 || Mount Lemmon || Mount Lemmon Survey || — || align=right | 1.0 km || 
|-id=483 bgcolor=#E9E9E9
| 429483 ||  || — || October 23, 2005 || Catalina || CSS || — || align=right | 1.5 km || 
|-id=484 bgcolor=#fefefe
| 429484 ||  || — || April 14, 2004 || Kitt Peak || Spacewatch || — || align=right data-sort-value="0.66" | 660 m || 
|-id=485 bgcolor=#fefefe
| 429485 ||  || — || January 9, 2011 || Kitt Peak || Spacewatch || MAS || align=right data-sort-value="0.67" | 670 m || 
|-id=486 bgcolor=#fefefe
| 429486 ||  || — || October 21, 2006 || Kitt Peak || Spacewatch || — || align=right data-sort-value="0.61" | 610 m || 
|-id=487 bgcolor=#fefefe
| 429487 ||  || — || November 17, 2006 || Kitt Peak || Spacewatch || — || align=right data-sort-value="0.85" | 850 m || 
|-id=488 bgcolor=#fefefe
| 429488 ||  || — || November 27, 2006 || Mount Lemmon || Mount Lemmon Survey || — || align=right data-sort-value="0.81" | 810 m || 
|-id=489 bgcolor=#fefefe
| 429489 ||  || — || December 8, 2010 || Mount Lemmon || Mount Lemmon Survey || NYS || align=right data-sort-value="0.66" | 660 m || 
|-id=490 bgcolor=#fefefe
| 429490 ||  || — || January 10, 2011 || Kitt Peak || Spacewatch || MAS || align=right data-sort-value="0.71" | 710 m || 
|-id=491 bgcolor=#fefefe
| 429491 ||  || — || November 17, 2006 || Kitt Peak || Spacewatch || — || align=right data-sort-value="0.73" | 730 m || 
|-id=492 bgcolor=#fefefe
| 429492 ||  || — || December 1, 2006 || Kitt Peak || Spacewatch || — || align=right data-sort-value="0.67" | 670 m || 
|-id=493 bgcolor=#d6d6d6
| 429493 ||  || — || January 11, 2011 || Kitt Peak || Spacewatch || BRA || align=right | 1.9 km || 
|-id=494 bgcolor=#fefefe
| 429494 ||  || — || December 1, 2006 || Mount Lemmon || Mount Lemmon Survey || (6769) || align=right data-sort-value="0.57" | 570 m || 
|-id=495 bgcolor=#fefefe
| 429495 ||  || — || August 16, 2009 || Kitt Peak || Spacewatch || V || align=right data-sort-value="0.66" | 660 m || 
|-id=496 bgcolor=#fefefe
| 429496 ||  || — || November 27, 2006 || Kitt Peak || Spacewatch || — || align=right data-sort-value="0.72" | 720 m || 
|-id=497 bgcolor=#fefefe
| 429497 ||  || — || December 5, 2010 || Mount Lemmon || Mount Lemmon Survey || — || align=right data-sort-value="0.79" | 790 m || 
|-id=498 bgcolor=#fefefe
| 429498 ||  || — || October 21, 2006 || Kitt Peak || Spacewatch || NYS || align=right data-sort-value="0.62" | 620 m || 
|-id=499 bgcolor=#E9E9E9
| 429499 ||  || — || January 14, 2011 || Kitt Peak || Spacewatch || KON || align=right | 2.1 km || 
|-id=500 bgcolor=#fefefe
| 429500 ||  || — || December 13, 2006 || Mount Lemmon || Mount Lemmon Survey || — || align=right data-sort-value="0.76" | 760 m || 
|}

429501–429600 

|-bgcolor=#fefefe
| 429501 ||  || — || January 9, 2011 || Kitt Peak || Spacewatch || MAS || align=right data-sort-value="0.75" | 750 m || 
|-id=502 bgcolor=#fefefe
| 429502 ||  || — || March 3, 2000 || Socorro || LINEAR || — || align=right data-sort-value="0.64" | 640 m || 
|-id=503 bgcolor=#fefefe
| 429503 ||  || — || March 18, 2004 || Socorro || LINEAR || — || align=right data-sort-value="0.99" | 990 m || 
|-id=504 bgcolor=#fefefe
| 429504 ||  || — || November 15, 2010 || Mount Lemmon || Mount Lemmon Survey || — || align=right data-sort-value="0.67" | 670 m || 
|-id=505 bgcolor=#fefefe
| 429505 ||  || — || October 6, 2005 || Kitt Peak || Spacewatch || — || align=right | 1.1 km || 
|-id=506 bgcolor=#fefefe
| 429506 ||  || — || January 8, 2011 || Mount Lemmon || Mount Lemmon Survey || — || align=right data-sort-value="0.86" | 860 m || 
|-id=507 bgcolor=#fefefe
| 429507 ||  || — || September 16, 2009 || Mount Lemmon || Mount Lemmon Survey || — || align=right | 1.00 km || 
|-id=508 bgcolor=#fefefe
| 429508 ||  || — || January 25, 2011 || Kitt Peak || Spacewatch || — || align=right data-sort-value="0.87" | 870 m || 
|-id=509 bgcolor=#fefefe
| 429509 ||  || — || February 2, 2008 || Kitt Peak || Spacewatch || — || align=right | 1.0 km || 
|-id=510 bgcolor=#fefefe
| 429510 ||  || — || March 11, 2008 || Mount Lemmon || Mount Lemmon Survey || — || align=right data-sort-value="0.82" | 820 m || 
|-id=511 bgcolor=#E9E9E9
| 429511 ||  || — || January 9, 2007 || Mount Lemmon || Mount Lemmon Survey || — || align=right data-sort-value="0.80" | 800 m || 
|-id=512 bgcolor=#E9E9E9
| 429512 ||  || — || November 2, 2010 || Mount Lemmon || Mount Lemmon Survey || — || align=right | 2.4 km || 
|-id=513 bgcolor=#fefefe
| 429513 ||  || — || December 13, 2006 || Mount Lemmon || Mount Lemmon Survey || NYS || align=right data-sort-value="0.56" | 560 m || 
|-id=514 bgcolor=#fefefe
| 429514 ||  || — || November 17, 2006 || Mount Lemmon || Mount Lemmon Survey || — || align=right data-sort-value="0.85" | 850 m || 
|-id=515 bgcolor=#fefefe
| 429515 ||  || — || December 21, 2006 || Kitt Peak || Spacewatch || — || align=right data-sort-value="0.87" | 870 m || 
|-id=516 bgcolor=#fefefe
| 429516 ||  || — || January 8, 2007 || Mount Lemmon || Mount Lemmon Survey || — || align=right data-sort-value="0.74" | 740 m || 
|-id=517 bgcolor=#fefefe
| 429517 ||  || — || September 17, 2009 || Kitt Peak || Spacewatch || — || align=right data-sort-value="0.92" | 920 m || 
|-id=518 bgcolor=#fefefe
| 429518 ||  || — || December 12, 2006 || Kitt Peak || Spacewatch || — || align=right data-sort-value="0.79" | 790 m || 
|-id=519 bgcolor=#E9E9E9
| 429519 ||  || — || February 20, 2007 || XuYi || PMO NEO || — || align=right | 1.2 km || 
|-id=520 bgcolor=#fefefe
| 429520 ||  || — || November 17, 2006 || Kitt Peak || Spacewatch || — || align=right data-sort-value="0.79" | 790 m || 
|-id=521 bgcolor=#E9E9E9
| 429521 ||  || — || July 29, 2008 || Kitt Peak || Spacewatch || — || align=right | 1.7 km || 
|-id=522 bgcolor=#E9E9E9
| 429522 ||  || — || February 8, 2007 || Kitt Peak || Spacewatch || — || align=right | 2.9 km || 
|-id=523 bgcolor=#fefefe
| 429523 ||  || — || December 21, 2006 || Kitt Peak || Spacewatch || — || align=right data-sort-value="0.84" | 840 m || 
|-id=524 bgcolor=#E9E9E9
| 429524 ||  || — || August 8, 2004 || Socorro || LINEAR || EUN || align=right | 1.3 km || 
|-id=525 bgcolor=#fefefe
| 429525 ||  || — || December 9, 2006 || Kitt Peak || Spacewatch || — || align=right data-sort-value="0.87" | 870 m || 
|-id=526 bgcolor=#fefefe
| 429526 ||  || — || January 27, 2007 || Mount Lemmon || Mount Lemmon Survey || — || align=right | 1.0 km || 
|-id=527 bgcolor=#fefefe
| 429527 ||  || — || October 27, 2009 || Mount Lemmon || Mount Lemmon Survey || — || align=right | 1.0 km || 
|-id=528 bgcolor=#E9E9E9
| 429528 ||  || — || November 6, 2010 || Kitt Peak || Spacewatch || RAF || align=right data-sort-value="0.92" | 920 m || 
|-id=529 bgcolor=#E9E9E9
| 429529 ||  || — || January 17, 2007 || Kitt Peak || Spacewatch || — || align=right data-sort-value="0.79" | 790 m || 
|-id=530 bgcolor=#fefefe
| 429530 ||  || — || July 29, 2009 || Kitt Peak || Spacewatch || V || align=right data-sort-value="0.81" | 810 m || 
|-id=531 bgcolor=#fefefe
| 429531 ||  || — || December 13, 2006 || Kitt Peak || Spacewatch || — || align=right data-sort-value="0.82" | 820 m || 
|-id=532 bgcolor=#E9E9E9
| 429532 ||  || — || July 28, 2008 || Siding Spring || SSS || — || align=right | 2.7 km || 
|-id=533 bgcolor=#fefefe
| 429533 ||  || — || February 8, 2000 || Kitt Peak || Spacewatch || — || align=right data-sort-value="0.80" | 800 m || 
|-id=534 bgcolor=#fefefe
| 429534 ||  || — || March 31, 2004 || Kitt Peak || Spacewatch || — || align=right data-sort-value="0.87" | 870 m || 
|-id=535 bgcolor=#fefefe
| 429535 ||  || — || March 16, 2004 || Kitt Peak || Spacewatch || — || align=right data-sort-value="0.70" | 700 m || 
|-id=536 bgcolor=#fefefe
| 429536 ||  || — || March 8, 2008 || Mount Lemmon || Mount Lemmon Survey || — || align=right data-sort-value="0.82" | 820 m || 
|-id=537 bgcolor=#fefefe
| 429537 ||  || — || January 8, 2011 || Mount Lemmon || Mount Lemmon Survey || — || align=right data-sort-value="0.78" | 780 m || 
|-id=538 bgcolor=#fefefe
| 429538 ||  || — || April 23, 2004 || Socorro || LINEAR || — || align=right data-sort-value="0.97" | 970 m || 
|-id=539 bgcolor=#fefefe
| 429539 ||  || — || April 20, 2004 || Socorro || LINEAR || — || align=right data-sort-value="0.93" | 930 m || 
|-id=540 bgcolor=#fefefe
| 429540 ||  || — || December 14, 2006 || Kitt Peak || Spacewatch || — || align=right data-sort-value="0.92" | 920 m || 
|-id=541 bgcolor=#fefefe
| 429541 ||  || — || April 25, 2004 || Kitt Peak || Spacewatch || NYS || align=right data-sort-value="0.51" | 510 m || 
|-id=542 bgcolor=#fefefe
| 429542 ||  || — || December 9, 2010 || Mount Lemmon || Mount Lemmon Survey || — || align=right data-sort-value="0.73" | 730 m || 
|-id=543 bgcolor=#fefefe
| 429543 ||  || — || November 15, 2010 || Mount Lemmon || Mount Lemmon Survey || MAS || align=right data-sort-value="0.90" | 900 m || 
|-id=544 bgcolor=#E9E9E9
| 429544 ||  || — || January 28, 2007 || Mount Lemmon || Mount Lemmon Survey || — || align=right data-sort-value="0.84" | 840 m || 
|-id=545 bgcolor=#E9E9E9
| 429545 ||  || — || March 14, 2007 || Anderson Mesa || LONEOS || — || align=right | 1.8 km || 
|-id=546 bgcolor=#E9E9E9
| 429546 ||  || — || November 1, 2005 || Mount Lemmon || Mount Lemmon Survey || — || align=right | 1.3 km || 
|-id=547 bgcolor=#E9E9E9
| 429547 ||  || — || December 10, 2010 || Mount Lemmon || Mount Lemmon Survey || — || align=right | 1.9 km || 
|-id=548 bgcolor=#fefefe
| 429548 ||  || — || December 6, 2010 || Mount Lemmon || Mount Lemmon Survey || — || align=right data-sort-value="0.87" | 870 m || 
|-id=549 bgcolor=#E9E9E9
| 429549 ||  || — || January 15, 2011 || Mount Lemmon || Mount Lemmon Survey || — || align=right | 1.4 km || 
|-id=550 bgcolor=#E9E9E9
| 429550 ||  || — || January 17, 2007 || Kitt Peak || Spacewatch || — || align=right | 1.00 km || 
|-id=551 bgcolor=#fefefe
| 429551 ||  || — || January 28, 2000 || Kitt Peak || Spacewatch || — || align=right data-sort-value="0.86" | 860 m || 
|-id=552 bgcolor=#fefefe
| 429552 ||  || — || April 13, 2004 || Kitt Peak || Spacewatch || CLA || align=right | 1.8 km || 
|-id=553 bgcolor=#fefefe
| 429553 ||  || — || November 16, 2006 || Kitt Peak || Spacewatch || — || align=right data-sort-value="0.73" | 730 m || 
|-id=554 bgcolor=#E9E9E9
| 429554 ||  || — || February 21, 2007 || Kitt Peak || Spacewatch || — || align=right data-sort-value="0.74" | 740 m || 
|-id=555 bgcolor=#E9E9E9
| 429555 ||  || — || January 27, 2011 || Mount Lemmon || Mount Lemmon Survey || EUN || align=right | 1.5 km || 
|-id=556 bgcolor=#E9E9E9
| 429556 ||  || — || February 5, 2011 || Catalina || CSS || EUN || align=right | 1.5 km || 
|-id=557 bgcolor=#E9E9E9
| 429557 ||  || — || March 25, 2007 || Mount Lemmon || Mount Lemmon Survey || JUN || align=right | 1.2 km || 
|-id=558 bgcolor=#fefefe
| 429558 ||  || — || November 7, 2002 || Kitt Peak || Spacewatch || — || align=right data-sort-value="0.92" | 920 m || 
|-id=559 bgcolor=#fefefe
| 429559 ||  || — || December 11, 2010 || Mount Lemmon || Mount Lemmon Survey || — || align=right data-sort-value="0.80" | 800 m || 
|-id=560 bgcolor=#E9E9E9
| 429560 ||  || — || January 18, 1998 || Kitt Peak || Spacewatch || — || align=right | 1.3 km || 
|-id=561 bgcolor=#E9E9E9
| 429561 ||  || — || January 27, 2011 || Kitt Peak || Spacewatch || — || align=right | 1.6 km || 
|-id=562 bgcolor=#E9E9E9
| 429562 ||  || — || March 23, 2003 || Kitt Peak || Spacewatch || — || align=right data-sort-value="0.82" | 820 m || 
|-id=563 bgcolor=#fefefe
| 429563 ||  || — || January 24, 2007 || Mount Lemmon || Mount Lemmon Survey || — || align=right data-sort-value="0.92" | 920 m || 
|-id=564 bgcolor=#fefefe
| 429564 ||  || — || November 1, 2005 || Kitt Peak || Spacewatch || — || align=right data-sort-value="0.70" | 700 m || 
|-id=565 bgcolor=#E9E9E9
| 429565 ||  || — || October 25, 2005 || Kitt Peak || Spacewatch || — || align=right data-sort-value="0.90" | 900 m || 
|-id=566 bgcolor=#E9E9E9
| 429566 ||  || — || April 23, 2007 || Kitt Peak || Spacewatch || — || align=right | 1.1 km || 
|-id=567 bgcolor=#E9E9E9
| 429567 ||  || — || February 22, 2011 || Kitt Peak || Spacewatch || — || align=right | 1.0 km || 
|-id=568 bgcolor=#E9E9E9
| 429568 ||  || — || September 22, 2009 || Mount Lemmon || Mount Lemmon Survey || — || align=right data-sort-value="0.78" | 780 m || 
|-id=569 bgcolor=#fefefe
| 429569 ||  || — || January 10, 2007 || Mount Lemmon || Mount Lemmon Survey || — || align=right data-sort-value="0.82" | 820 m || 
|-id=570 bgcolor=#E9E9E9
| 429570 ||  || — || January 28, 2010 || WISE || WISE || — || align=right | 1.6 km || 
|-id=571 bgcolor=#E9E9E9
| 429571 ||  || — || February 10, 2011 || Mount Lemmon || Mount Lemmon Survey || BRG || align=right | 1.8 km || 
|-id=572 bgcolor=#E9E9E9
| 429572 ||  || — || January 28, 2007 || Kitt Peak || Spacewatch || — || align=right | 2.9 km || 
|-id=573 bgcolor=#fefefe
| 429573 ||  || — || August 17, 2009 || Kitt Peak || Spacewatch || — || align=right data-sort-value="0.90" | 900 m || 
|-id=574 bgcolor=#E9E9E9
| 429574 ||  || — || October 21, 2009 || Mount Lemmon || Mount Lemmon Survey || — || align=right | 1.3 km || 
|-id=575 bgcolor=#E9E9E9
| 429575 ||  || — || August 27, 2009 || Kitt Peak || Spacewatch || — || align=right | 1.2 km || 
|-id=576 bgcolor=#fefefe
| 429576 ||  || — || January 16, 2011 || Mount Lemmon || Mount Lemmon Survey || NYS || align=right data-sort-value="0.57" | 570 m || 
|-id=577 bgcolor=#fefefe
| 429577 ||  || — || December 15, 2006 || Kitt Peak || Spacewatch || NYS || align=right data-sort-value="0.65" | 650 m || 
|-id=578 bgcolor=#E9E9E9
| 429578 ||  || — || December 7, 2005 || Catalina || CSS || — || align=right | 2.5 km || 
|-id=579 bgcolor=#E9E9E9
| 429579 ||  || — || November 26, 2009 || Mount Lemmon || Mount Lemmon Survey || — || align=right | 1.4 km || 
|-id=580 bgcolor=#E9E9E9
| 429580 ||  || — || March 14, 2007 || Kitt Peak || Spacewatch || — || align=right data-sort-value="0.78" | 780 m || 
|-id=581 bgcolor=#E9E9E9
| 429581 ||  || — || March 13, 2007 || Kitt Peak || Spacewatch || — || align=right data-sort-value="0.86" | 860 m || 
|-id=582 bgcolor=#E9E9E9
| 429582 ||  || — || May 6, 2003 || Kitt Peak || Spacewatch || — || align=right data-sort-value="0.85" | 850 m || 
|-id=583 bgcolor=#E9E9E9
| 429583 ||  || — || December 27, 2005 || Kitt Peak || Spacewatch || — || align=right | 1.4 km || 
|-id=584 bgcolor=#FFC2E0
| 429584 ||  || — || March 8, 2011 || Socorro || LINEAR || APOPHA || align=right data-sort-value="0.39" | 390 m || 
|-id=585 bgcolor=#E9E9E9
| 429585 ||  || — || February 13, 2010 || WISE || WISE || — || align=right | 1.6 km || 
|-id=586 bgcolor=#E9E9E9
| 429586 ||  || — || March 6, 2011 || Kitt Peak || Spacewatch || — || align=right | 2.0 km || 
|-id=587 bgcolor=#E9E9E9
| 429587 ||  || — || November 17, 2009 || Mount Lemmon || Mount Lemmon Survey || — || align=right data-sort-value="0.91" | 910 m || 
|-id=588 bgcolor=#E9E9E9
| 429588 ||  || — || March 29, 2007 || Kitt Peak || Spacewatch || — || align=right data-sort-value="0.85" | 850 m || 
|-id=589 bgcolor=#E9E9E9
| 429589 ||  || — || April 20, 2007 || Kitt Peak || Spacewatch || — || align=right | 1.4 km || 
|-id=590 bgcolor=#E9E9E9
| 429590 ||  || — || March 9, 2011 || Kitt Peak || Spacewatch || — || align=right | 1.6 km || 
|-id=591 bgcolor=#E9E9E9
| 429591 ||  || — || September 10, 2004 || Kitt Peak || Spacewatch || — || align=right | 2.4 km || 
|-id=592 bgcolor=#fefefe
| 429592 ||  || — || November 17, 2009 || Mount Lemmon || Mount Lemmon Survey || — || align=right data-sort-value="0.87" | 870 m || 
|-id=593 bgcolor=#fefefe
| 429593 ||  || — || February 23, 2007 || Kitt Peak || Spacewatch || — || align=right data-sort-value="0.89" | 890 m || 
|-id=594 bgcolor=#E9E9E9
| 429594 ||  || — || October 7, 2004 || Kitt Peak || Spacewatch || EUN || align=right | 1.1 km || 
|-id=595 bgcolor=#E9E9E9
| 429595 ||  || — || March 10, 2011 || Kitt Peak || Spacewatch || — || align=right | 1.6 km || 
|-id=596 bgcolor=#E9E9E9
| 429596 ||  || — || October 21, 2004 || Socorro || LINEAR || — || align=right | 2.9 km || 
|-id=597 bgcolor=#E9E9E9
| 429597 ||  || — || March 19, 2010 || WISE || WISE || — || align=right | 2.5 km || 
|-id=598 bgcolor=#E9E9E9
| 429598 ||  || — || March 13, 2007 || Mount Lemmon || Mount Lemmon Survey || — || align=right | 1.5 km || 
|-id=599 bgcolor=#E9E9E9
| 429599 ||  || — || November 12, 2005 || Kitt Peak || Spacewatch || (5) || align=right data-sort-value="0.85" | 850 m || 
|-id=600 bgcolor=#E9E9E9
| 429600 ||  || — || March 5, 2011 || Catalina || CSS || — || align=right | 1.8 km || 
|}

429601–429700 

|-bgcolor=#E9E9E9
| 429601 ||  || — || October 2, 2009 || Mount Lemmon || Mount Lemmon Survey || — || align=right | 1.7 km || 
|-id=602 bgcolor=#E9E9E9
| 429602 ||  || — || September 29, 2009 || Mount Lemmon || Mount Lemmon Survey || — || align=right | 1.2 km || 
|-id=603 bgcolor=#E9E9E9
| 429603 ||  || — || April 15, 2007 || Kitt Peak || Spacewatch || — || align=right | 1.9 km || 
|-id=604 bgcolor=#E9E9E9
| 429604 ||  || — || February 9, 2011 || Mount Lemmon || Mount Lemmon Survey || — || align=right | 2.0 km || 
|-id=605 bgcolor=#E9E9E9
| 429605 ||  || — || September 23, 2008 || Mount Lemmon || Mount Lemmon Survey || DOR || align=right | 2.6 km || 
|-id=606 bgcolor=#E9E9E9
| 429606 ||  || — || October 8, 2004 || Kitt Peak || Spacewatch || — || align=right | 1.8 km || 
|-id=607 bgcolor=#E9E9E9
| 429607 ||  || — || March 26, 2007 || Kitt Peak || Spacewatch || — || align=right data-sort-value="0.89" | 890 m || 
|-id=608 bgcolor=#E9E9E9
| 429608 ||  || — || March 4, 2011 || Kitt Peak || Spacewatch || DOR || align=right | 2.5 km || 
|-id=609 bgcolor=#E9E9E9
| 429609 ||  || — || November 19, 2009 || Catalina || CSS || — || align=right | 1.1 km || 
|-id=610 bgcolor=#E9E9E9
| 429610 ||  || — || November 9, 2009 || Mount Lemmon || Mount Lemmon Survey || — || align=right | 1.8 km || 
|-id=611 bgcolor=#E9E9E9
| 429611 ||  || — || April 26, 2003 || Kitt Peak || Spacewatch || — || align=right data-sort-value="0.98" | 980 m || 
|-id=612 bgcolor=#E9E9E9
| 429612 ||  || — || December 2, 2005 || Mount Lemmon || Mount Lemmon Survey || — || align=right | 1.1 km || 
|-id=613 bgcolor=#E9E9E9
| 429613 ||  || — || April 18, 2007 || Kitt Peak || Spacewatch || — || align=right | 1.4 km || 
|-id=614 bgcolor=#E9E9E9
| 429614 ||  || — || March 6, 2011 || Kitt Peak || Spacewatch || — || align=right | 2.5 km || 
|-id=615 bgcolor=#E9E9E9
| 429615 ||  || — || December 11, 2009 || Mount Lemmon || Mount Lemmon Survey || — || align=right | 1.6 km || 
|-id=616 bgcolor=#E9E9E9
| 429616 ||  || — || January 27, 2007 || Kitt Peak || Spacewatch || — || align=right | 1.8 km || 
|-id=617 bgcolor=#E9E9E9
| 429617 ||  || — || October 1, 2008 || Kitt Peak || Spacewatch ||  || align=right | 2.1 km || 
|-id=618 bgcolor=#E9E9E9
| 429618 ||  || — || December 10, 2005 || Kitt Peak || Spacewatch || — || align=right | 1.4 km || 
|-id=619 bgcolor=#E9E9E9
| 429619 ||  || — || September 27, 2008 || Mount Lemmon || Mount Lemmon Survey || — || align=right | 1.5 km || 
|-id=620 bgcolor=#E9E9E9
| 429620 ||  || — || April 25, 2007 || Mount Lemmon || Mount Lemmon Survey || — || align=right | 1.3 km || 
|-id=621 bgcolor=#E9E9E9
| 429621 ||  || — || August 22, 1995 || Kitt Peak || Spacewatch || — || align=right | 1.5 km || 
|-id=622 bgcolor=#E9E9E9
| 429622 ||  || — || September 11, 2004 || Kitt Peak || Spacewatch || — || align=right | 1.1 km || 
|-id=623 bgcolor=#E9E9E9
| 429623 ||  || — || March 15, 2007 || Kitt Peak || Spacewatch || — || align=right data-sort-value="0.77" | 770 m || 
|-id=624 bgcolor=#E9E9E9
| 429624 ||  || — || March 20, 2007 || Kitt Peak || Spacewatch || — || align=right data-sort-value="0.68" | 680 m || 
|-id=625 bgcolor=#E9E9E9
| 429625 ||  || — || September 11, 2004 || Kitt Peak || Spacewatch || — || align=right | 1.6 km || 
|-id=626 bgcolor=#E9E9E9
| 429626 ||  || — || March 11, 2011 || Kitt Peak || Spacewatch || JUN || align=right | 1.1 km || 
|-id=627 bgcolor=#E9E9E9
| 429627 ||  || — || March 4, 2011 || Kitt Peak || Spacewatch || — || align=right | 1.9 km || 
|-id=628 bgcolor=#E9E9E9
| 429628 ||  || — || January 10, 2006 || Kitt Peak || Spacewatch || — || align=right | 2.0 km || 
|-id=629 bgcolor=#E9E9E9
| 429629 ||  || — || April 20, 2007 || Kitt Peak || Spacewatch || — || align=right | 1.8 km || 
|-id=630 bgcolor=#E9E9E9
| 429630 ||  || — || September 19, 2008 || Kitt Peak || Spacewatch || — || align=right | 1.8 km || 
|-id=631 bgcolor=#E9E9E9
| 429631 ||  || — || October 5, 2004 || Kitt Peak || Spacewatch || — || align=right | 2.3 km || 
|-id=632 bgcolor=#E9E9E9
| 429632 ||  || — || January 31, 2006 || Kitt Peak || Spacewatch || — || align=right | 1.9 km || 
|-id=633 bgcolor=#E9E9E9
| 429633 ||  || — || March 4, 2011 || Kitt Peak || Spacewatch || — || align=right | 1.3 km || 
|-id=634 bgcolor=#E9E9E9
| 429634 ||  || — || November 21, 2009 || Catalina || CSS || — || align=right | 2.2 km || 
|-id=635 bgcolor=#E9E9E9
| 429635 ||  || — || October 23, 2004 || Kitt Peak || Spacewatch || — || align=right | 2.4 km || 
|-id=636 bgcolor=#E9E9E9
| 429636 ||  || — || January 11, 2011 || Mount Lemmon || Mount Lemmon Survey || — || align=right | 1.7 km || 
|-id=637 bgcolor=#E9E9E9
| 429637 ||  || — || April 19, 2007 || Kitt Peak || Spacewatch || — || align=right | 1.2 km || 
|-id=638 bgcolor=#E9E9E9
| 429638 ||  || — || March 12, 2007 || Kitt Peak || Spacewatch || — || align=right data-sort-value="0.82" | 820 m || 
|-id=639 bgcolor=#E9E9E9
| 429639 ||  || — || October 22, 2009 || Mount Lemmon || Mount Lemmon Survey || — || align=right | 1.1 km || 
|-id=640 bgcolor=#E9E9E9
| 429640 ||  || — || February 10, 2011 || Mount Lemmon || Mount Lemmon Survey || — || align=right | 1.1 km || 
|-id=641 bgcolor=#E9E9E9
| 429641 ||  || — || February 10, 2011 || Mount Lemmon || Mount Lemmon Survey || EUN || align=right data-sort-value="0.90" | 900 m || 
|-id=642 bgcolor=#E9E9E9
| 429642 ||  || — || December 6, 2005 || Kitt Peak || Spacewatch || — || align=right | 1.2 km || 
|-id=643 bgcolor=#E9E9E9
| 429643 ||  || — || October 2, 2008 || Kitt Peak || Spacewatch || — || align=right | 1.5 km || 
|-id=644 bgcolor=#E9E9E9
| 429644 ||  || — || September 23, 2008 || Kitt Peak || Spacewatch || — || align=right | 1.7 km || 
|-id=645 bgcolor=#E9E9E9
| 429645 ||  || — || October 29, 2008 || Kitt Peak || Spacewatch || — || align=right | 1.7 km || 
|-id=646 bgcolor=#E9E9E9
| 429646 ||  || — || April 25, 2007 || Kitt Peak || Spacewatch || KON || align=right | 2.4 km || 
|-id=647 bgcolor=#E9E9E9
| 429647 ||  || — || March 10, 2007 || Kitt Peak || Spacewatch || — || align=right | 1.1 km || 
|-id=648 bgcolor=#E9E9E9
| 429648 ||  || — || November 8, 2009 || Mount Lemmon || Mount Lemmon Survey || — || align=right | 1.0 km || 
|-id=649 bgcolor=#E9E9E9
| 429649 ||  || — || November 20, 2009 || Kitt Peak || Spacewatch || fast? || align=right | 3.2 km || 
|-id=650 bgcolor=#E9E9E9
| 429650 ||  || — || March 1, 2011 || Mount Lemmon || Mount Lemmon Survey || EUN || align=right | 1.2 km || 
|-id=651 bgcolor=#E9E9E9
| 429651 ||  || — || March 3, 2006 || Kitt Peak || Spacewatch || AGN || align=right data-sort-value="0.99" | 990 m || 
|-id=652 bgcolor=#E9E9E9
| 429652 ||  || — || September 21, 2008 || Kitt Peak || Spacewatch || — || align=right | 1.9 km || 
|-id=653 bgcolor=#E9E9E9
| 429653 ||  || — || October 26, 2008 || Mount Lemmon || Mount Lemmon Survey || — || align=right | 1.5 km || 
|-id=654 bgcolor=#E9E9E9
| 429654 ||  || — || April 22, 2007 || Mount Lemmon || Mount Lemmon Survey || EUN || align=right | 1.1 km || 
|-id=655 bgcolor=#E9E9E9
| 429655 ||  || — || October 10, 2004 || Kitt Peak || Spacewatch || MAR || align=right | 1.2 km || 
|-id=656 bgcolor=#E9E9E9
| 429656 ||  || — || September 2, 2008 || Kitt Peak || Spacewatch || — || align=right | 1.8 km || 
|-id=657 bgcolor=#E9E9E9
| 429657 ||  || — || March 11, 2007 || Mount Lemmon || Mount Lemmon Survey || — || align=right data-sort-value="0.70" | 700 m || 
|-id=658 bgcolor=#E9E9E9
| 429658 ||  || — || September 7, 2008 || Mount Lemmon || Mount Lemmon Survey || — || align=right | 1.1 km || 
|-id=659 bgcolor=#E9E9E9
| 429659 ||  || — || December 28, 2000 || Kitt Peak || Spacewatch || — || align=right | 2.9 km || 
|-id=660 bgcolor=#E9E9E9
| 429660 ||  || — || March 14, 2011 || Catalina || CSS || EUN || align=right | 1.4 km || 
|-id=661 bgcolor=#E9E9E9
| 429661 ||  || — || March 13, 2010 || WISE || WISE || — || align=right | 1.6 km || 
|-id=662 bgcolor=#E9E9E9
| 429662 ||  || — || March 2, 2011 || Kitt Peak || Spacewatch || — || align=right | 2.3 km || 
|-id=663 bgcolor=#E9E9E9
| 429663 ||  || — || May 7, 2007 || Kitt Peak || Spacewatch || EUN || align=right | 1.1 km || 
|-id=664 bgcolor=#E9E9E9
| 429664 ||  || — || April 6, 2011 || Mount Lemmon || Mount Lemmon Survey || — || align=right | 2.5 km || 
|-id=665 bgcolor=#E9E9E9
| 429665 ||  || — || August 18, 2003 || Campo Imperatore || CINEOS || — || align=right | 1.5 km || 
|-id=666 bgcolor=#E9E9E9
| 429666 ||  || — || March 26, 2011 || Mount Lemmon || Mount Lemmon Survey || — || align=right | 1.9 km || 
|-id=667 bgcolor=#E9E9E9
| 429667 ||  || — || January 31, 2006 || Kitt Peak || Spacewatch || — || align=right | 2.0 km || 
|-id=668 bgcolor=#E9E9E9
| 429668 ||  || — || November 10, 2009 || Kitt Peak || Spacewatch || — || align=right | 1.7 km || 
|-id=669 bgcolor=#E9E9E9
| 429669 ||  || — || April 22, 2007 || Catalina || CSS || — || align=right | 3.1 km || 
|-id=670 bgcolor=#d6d6d6
| 429670 ||  || — || December 20, 2009 || Mount Lemmon || Mount Lemmon Survey || BRA || align=right | 1.7 km || 
|-id=671 bgcolor=#E9E9E9
| 429671 ||  || — || March 27, 2011 || Kitt Peak || Spacewatch || — || align=right | 1.9 km || 
|-id=672 bgcolor=#E9E9E9
| 429672 ||  || — || February 7, 2006 || Kitt Peak || Spacewatch || — || align=right | 1.5 km || 
|-id=673 bgcolor=#d6d6d6
| 429673 ||  || — || October 28, 2008 || Mount Lemmon || Mount Lemmon Survey || BRA || align=right | 1.2 km || 
|-id=674 bgcolor=#E9E9E9
| 429674 ||  || — || February 20, 2006 || Kitt Peak || Spacewatch || EUN || align=right | 1.2 km || 
|-id=675 bgcolor=#E9E9E9
| 429675 ||  || — || April 11, 2011 || Mount Lemmon || Mount Lemmon Survey || — || align=right | 1.8 km || 
|-id=676 bgcolor=#E9E9E9
| 429676 ||  || — || August 22, 2004 || Kitt Peak || Spacewatch || — || align=right | 1.2 km || 
|-id=677 bgcolor=#E9E9E9
| 429677 ||  || — || March 15, 2011 || Mount Lemmon || Mount Lemmon Survey || — || align=right | 1.9 km || 
|-id=678 bgcolor=#E9E9E9
| 429678 ||  || — || October 22, 2008 || Mount Lemmon || Mount Lemmon Survey || — || align=right | 1.4 km || 
|-id=679 bgcolor=#E9E9E9
| 429679 ||  || — || March 14, 2007 || Siding Spring || SSS || — || align=right | 1.6 km || 
|-id=680 bgcolor=#E9E9E9
| 429680 ||  || — || October 1, 2008 || Mount Lemmon || Mount Lemmon Survey || — || align=right | 1.2 km || 
|-id=681 bgcolor=#d6d6d6
| 429681 ||  || — || May 24, 2006 || Kitt Peak || Spacewatch || — || align=right | 2.4 km || 
|-id=682 bgcolor=#E9E9E9
| 429682 ||  || — || October 6, 2008 || Mount Lemmon || Mount Lemmon Survey || — || align=right | 2.0 km || 
|-id=683 bgcolor=#E9E9E9
| 429683 ||  || — || September 22, 2008 || Socorro || LINEAR || — || align=right | 1.9 km || 
|-id=684 bgcolor=#E9E9E9
| 429684 ||  || — || May 10, 2007 || Mount Lemmon || Mount Lemmon Survey || — || align=right | 1.4 km || 
|-id=685 bgcolor=#E9E9E9
| 429685 ||  || — || September 23, 2008 || Kitt Peak || Spacewatch || — || align=right | 1.7 km || 
|-id=686 bgcolor=#E9E9E9
| 429686 ||  || — || December 1, 2008 || Kitt Peak || Spacewatch || — || align=right | 3.4 km || 
|-id=687 bgcolor=#E9E9E9
| 429687 ||  || — || April 10, 2002 || Socorro || LINEAR || — || align=right | 2.0 km || 
|-id=688 bgcolor=#d6d6d6
| 429688 ||  || — || March 8, 2005 || Mount Lemmon || Mount Lemmon Survey || EOS || align=right | 2.3 km || 
|-id=689 bgcolor=#E9E9E9
| 429689 ||  || — || April 20, 2007 || Mount Lemmon || Mount Lemmon Survey || — || align=right | 1.0 km || 
|-id=690 bgcolor=#E9E9E9
| 429690 ||  || — || December 4, 2005 || Kitt Peak || Spacewatch || — || align=right data-sort-value="0.98" | 980 m || 
|-id=691 bgcolor=#E9E9E9
| 429691 ||  || — || January 4, 2006 || Kitt Peak || Spacewatch || — || align=right | 1.1 km || 
|-id=692 bgcolor=#d6d6d6
| 429692 ||  || — || May 24, 2006 || Kitt Peak || Spacewatch || BRA || align=right | 1.5 km || 
|-id=693 bgcolor=#d6d6d6
| 429693 ||  || — || January 8, 2010 || Kitt Peak || Spacewatch || — || align=right | 3.1 km || 
|-id=694 bgcolor=#d6d6d6
| 429694 ||  || — || November 21, 2009 || Mount Lemmon || Mount Lemmon Survey || EOS || align=right | 2.1 km || 
|-id=695 bgcolor=#E9E9E9
| 429695 ||  || — || June 27, 1998 || Kitt Peak || Spacewatch || — || align=right | 1.7 km || 
|-id=696 bgcolor=#E9E9E9
| 429696 ||  || — || November 18, 2009 || Mount Lemmon || Mount Lemmon Survey || — || align=right | 1.7 km || 
|-id=697 bgcolor=#E9E9E9
| 429697 ||  || — || December 18, 2009 || Kitt Peak || Spacewatch || — || align=right | 1.8 km || 
|-id=698 bgcolor=#E9E9E9
| 429698 ||  || — || March 13, 2010 || WISE || WISE || — || align=right | 2.3 km || 
|-id=699 bgcolor=#E9E9E9
| 429699 ||  || — || March 14, 2010 || WISE || WISE || — || align=right | 3.4 km || 
|-id=700 bgcolor=#E9E9E9
| 429700 ||  || — || February 25, 2006 || Mount Lemmon || Mount Lemmon Survey || — || align=right | 2.0 km || 
|}

429701–429800 

|-bgcolor=#E9E9E9
| 429701 ||  || — || January 26, 2006 || Catalina || CSS || — || align=right | 2.1 km || 
|-id=702 bgcolor=#E9E9E9
| 429702 ||  || — || April 1, 2011 || Mount Lemmon || Mount Lemmon Survey || — || align=right | 1.4 km || 
|-id=703 bgcolor=#E9E9E9
| 429703 ||  || — || June 12, 2007 || Kitt Peak || Spacewatch || — || align=right data-sort-value="0.96" | 960 m || 
|-id=704 bgcolor=#E9E9E9
| 429704 ||  || — || April 5, 2011 || Kitt Peak || Spacewatch || — || align=right | 2.3 km || 
|-id=705 bgcolor=#d6d6d6
| 429705 ||  || — || April 27, 2011 || Kitt Peak || Spacewatch || VER || align=right | 3.1 km || 
|-id=706 bgcolor=#E9E9E9
| 429706 ||  || — || September 24, 2008 || Mount Lemmon || Mount Lemmon Survey || — || align=right | 1.6 km || 
|-id=707 bgcolor=#E9E9E9
| 429707 ||  || — || March 28, 2011 || Kitt Peak || Spacewatch || — || align=right | 1.3 km || 
|-id=708 bgcolor=#E9E9E9
| 429708 ||  || — || April 10, 2010 || WISE || WISE || — || align=right | 2.6 km || 
|-id=709 bgcolor=#E9E9E9
| 429709 ||  || — || March 14, 2011 || Kitt Peak || Spacewatch || — || align=right | 1.3 km || 
|-id=710 bgcolor=#E9E9E9
| 429710 ||  || — || December 18, 2009 || Mount Lemmon || Mount Lemmon Survey || — || align=right | 2.2 km || 
|-id=711 bgcolor=#E9E9E9
| 429711 ||  || — || March 28, 2010 || WISE || WISE || — || align=right | 3.8 km || 
|-id=712 bgcolor=#E9E9E9
| 429712 ||  || — || November 30, 2005 || Mount Lemmon || Mount Lemmon Survey || — || align=right | 2.2 km || 
|-id=713 bgcolor=#E9E9E9
| 429713 ||  || — || April 17, 2007 || Catalina || CSS || — || align=right | 1.0 km || 
|-id=714 bgcolor=#E9E9E9
| 429714 ||  || — || April 25, 2007 || Mount Lemmon || Mount Lemmon Survey || — || align=right | 1.0 km || 
|-id=715 bgcolor=#E9E9E9
| 429715 ||  || — || November 12, 2005 || Kitt Peak || Spacewatch || — || align=right | 1.2 km || 
|-id=716 bgcolor=#E9E9E9
| 429716 ||  || — || April 13, 2011 || Catalina || CSS || — || align=right | 1.8 km || 
|-id=717 bgcolor=#E9E9E9
| 429717 ||  || — || November 6, 2008 || Catalina || CSS || — || align=right | 2.8 km || 
|-id=718 bgcolor=#d6d6d6
| 429718 ||  || — || May 8, 2011 || Mount Lemmon || Mount Lemmon Survey || — || align=right | 3.1 km || 
|-id=719 bgcolor=#d6d6d6
| 429719 ||  || — || October 11, 2007 || Kitt Peak || Spacewatch || — || align=right | 3.4 km || 
|-id=720 bgcolor=#E9E9E9
| 429720 ||  || — || June 8, 2007 || Kitt Peak || Spacewatch || — || align=right | 1.2 km || 
|-id=721 bgcolor=#E9E9E9
| 429721 ||  || — || November 20, 2008 || Kitt Peak || Spacewatch || — || align=right | 2.4 km || 
|-id=722 bgcolor=#E9E9E9
| 429722 ||  || — || April 30, 2011 || Mount Lemmon || Mount Lemmon Survey || — || align=right | 1.6 km || 
|-id=723 bgcolor=#d6d6d6
| 429723 ||  || — || November 19, 2008 || Kitt Peak || Spacewatch || EOS || align=right | 2.4 km || 
|-id=724 bgcolor=#E9E9E9
| 429724 ||  || — || February 28, 2010 || WISE || WISE || — || align=right | 3.3 km || 
|-id=725 bgcolor=#d6d6d6
| 429725 ||  || — || February 9, 2010 || Kitt Peak || Spacewatch || — || align=right | 2.8 km || 
|-id=726 bgcolor=#E9E9E9
| 429726 ||  || — || May 21, 2011 || Mount Lemmon || Mount Lemmon Survey || — || align=right | 1.9 km || 
|-id=727 bgcolor=#E9E9E9
| 429727 ||  || — || December 25, 2005 || Kitt Peak || Spacewatch || — || align=right | 1.0 km || 
|-id=728 bgcolor=#E9E9E9
| 429728 ||  || — || November 17, 2009 || Mount Lemmon || Mount Lemmon Survey || — || align=right | 2.0 km || 
|-id=729 bgcolor=#E9E9E9
| 429729 ||  || — || June 10, 2007 || Siding Spring || SSS || — || align=right | 1.4 km || 
|-id=730 bgcolor=#E9E9E9
| 429730 ||  || — || February 24, 2006 || Kitt Peak || Spacewatch || — || align=right | 1.8 km || 
|-id=731 bgcolor=#d6d6d6
| 429731 ||  || — || December 19, 2009 || Mount Lemmon || Mount Lemmon Survey || — || align=right | 1.9 km || 
|-id=732 bgcolor=#d6d6d6
| 429732 ||  || — || January 30, 2009 || Mount Lemmon || Mount Lemmon Survey || Tj (2.98) || align=right | 3.4 km || 
|-id=733 bgcolor=#FFC2E0
| 429733 ||  || — || June 6, 2011 || Catalina || CSS || AMO +1km || align=right | 1.7 km || 
|-id=734 bgcolor=#E9E9E9
| 429734 ||  || — || December 17, 2009 || Mount Lemmon || Mount Lemmon Survey || GEF || align=right | 1.5 km || 
|-id=735 bgcolor=#E9E9E9
| 429735 ||  || — || June 19, 2011 || Siding Spring || SSS || — || align=right | 2.0 km || 
|-id=736 bgcolor=#FFC2E0
| 429736 ||  || — || June 24, 2011 || Siding Spring || SSS || APOcritical || align=right data-sort-value="0.31" | 310 m || 
|-id=737 bgcolor=#d6d6d6
| 429737 ||  || — || February 28, 2009 || Mount Lemmon || Mount Lemmon Survey || — || align=right | 3.3 km || 
|-id=738 bgcolor=#d6d6d6
| 429738 ||  || — || February 25, 2004 || Socorro || LINEAR || — || align=right | 5.3 km || 
|-id=739 bgcolor=#d6d6d6
| 429739 ||  || — || June 13, 2011 || Mount Lemmon || Mount Lemmon Survey || 7:4 || align=right | 3.2 km || 
|-id=740 bgcolor=#d6d6d6
| 429740 ||  || — || February 3, 2009 || Mount Lemmon || Mount Lemmon Survey || — || align=right | 3.3 km || 
|-id=741 bgcolor=#d6d6d6
| 429741 ||  || — || February 17, 2004 || Kitt Peak || Spacewatch || — || align=right | 3.3 km || 
|-id=742 bgcolor=#d6d6d6
| 429742 ||  || — || January 25, 2009 || Kitt Peak || Spacewatch || Tj (2.99) || align=right | 3.8 km || 
|-id=743 bgcolor=#d6d6d6
| 429743 ||  || — || April 6, 2005 || Mount Lemmon || Mount Lemmon Survey || — || align=right | 4.1 km || 
|-id=744 bgcolor=#d6d6d6
| 429744 ||  || — || January 22, 2010 || WISE || WISE || — || align=right | 3.9 km || 
|-id=745 bgcolor=#d6d6d6
| 429745 ||  || — || January 29, 2010 || WISE || WISE || LIX || align=right | 5.3 km || 
|-id=746 bgcolor=#FFC2E0
| 429746 ||  || — || September 18, 2011 || Haleakala || Pan-STARRS || AMO +1km || align=right | 1.3 km || 
|-id=747 bgcolor=#d6d6d6
| 429747 ||  || — || February 16, 2010 || WISE || WISE || — || align=right | 4.2 km || 
|-id=748 bgcolor=#fefefe
| 429748 ||  || — || August 26, 1998 || Kitt Peak || Spacewatch || H || align=right data-sort-value="0.75" | 750 m || 
|-id=749 bgcolor=#FA8072
| 429749 ||  || — || March 9, 2005 || Socorro || LINEAR || H || align=right data-sort-value="0.78" | 780 m || 
|-id=750 bgcolor=#d6d6d6
| 429750 ||  || — || August 29, 2000 || Socorro || LINEAR || — || align=right | 2.0 km || 
|-id=751 bgcolor=#fefefe
| 429751 ||  || — || December 25, 2009 || Kitt Peak || Spacewatch || H || align=right | 1.1 km || 
|-id=752 bgcolor=#d6d6d6
| 429752 ||  || — || October 1, 2000 || Socorro || LINEAR || — || align=right | 4.3 km || 
|-id=753 bgcolor=#FA8072
| 429753 ||  || — || April 11, 2010 || Kitt Peak || Spacewatch || H || align=right data-sort-value="0.86" | 860 m || 
|-id=754 bgcolor=#fefefe
| 429754 ||  || — || June 16, 2005 || Kitt Peak || Spacewatch || H || align=right data-sort-value="0.72" | 720 m || 
|-id=755 bgcolor=#fefefe
| 429755 ||  || — || October 23, 2011 || Kitt Peak || Spacewatch || H || align=right data-sort-value="0.78" | 780 m || 
|-id=756 bgcolor=#fefefe
| 429756 ||  || — || April 10, 2010 || Kitt Peak || Spacewatch || H || align=right data-sort-value="0.59" | 590 m || 
|-id=757 bgcolor=#fefefe
| 429757 ||  || — || March 20, 2010 || Kitt Peak || Spacewatch || H || align=right data-sort-value="0.73" | 730 m || 
|-id=758 bgcolor=#C2FFFF
| 429758 ||  || — || October 12, 2010 || Mount Lemmon || Mount Lemmon Survey || L4 || align=right | 9.3 km || 
|-id=759 bgcolor=#C2FFFF
| 429759 ||  || — || September 21, 2008 || Mount Lemmon || Mount Lemmon Survey || L4 || align=right | 14 km || 
|-id=760 bgcolor=#fefefe
| 429760 ||  || — || May 28, 2000 || Socorro || LINEAR || H || align=right data-sort-value="0.71" | 710 m || 
|-id=761 bgcolor=#fefefe
| 429761 ||  || — || August 27, 2005 || Anderson Mesa || LONEOS || H || align=right data-sort-value="0.75" | 750 m || 
|-id=762 bgcolor=#fefefe
| 429762 ||  || — || February 21, 2012 || Kitt Peak || Spacewatch || — || align=right data-sort-value="0.67" | 670 m || 
|-id=763 bgcolor=#fefefe
| 429763 ||  || — || February 20, 2012 || Kitt Peak || Spacewatch || — || align=right data-sort-value="0.83" | 830 m || 
|-id=764 bgcolor=#fefefe
| 429764 ||  || — || September 6, 2002 || Socorro || LINEAR || H || align=right data-sort-value="0.71" | 710 m || 
|-id=765 bgcolor=#fefefe
| 429765 ||  || — || October 14, 2010 || Mount Lemmon || Mount Lemmon Survey || — || align=right data-sort-value="0.72" | 720 m || 
|-id=766 bgcolor=#fefefe
| 429766 ||  || — || February 26, 2012 || Kitt Peak || Spacewatch || — || align=right data-sort-value="0.68" | 680 m || 
|-id=767 bgcolor=#fefefe
| 429767 ||  || — || January 7, 2002 || Kitt Peak || Spacewatch || — || align=right data-sort-value="0.57" | 570 m || 
|-id=768 bgcolor=#fefefe
| 429768 ||  || — || September 5, 2010 || Mount Lemmon || Mount Lemmon Survey || — || align=right data-sort-value="0.60" | 600 m || 
|-id=769 bgcolor=#fefefe
| 429769 ||  || — || September 3, 2010 || Mount Lemmon || Mount Lemmon Survey || — || align=right data-sort-value="0.71" | 710 m || 
|-id=770 bgcolor=#fefefe
| 429770 ||  || — || February 21, 2001 || Socorro || LINEAR || H || align=right | 1.0 km || 
|-id=771 bgcolor=#fefefe
| 429771 ||  || — || November 14, 2007 || Kitt Peak || Spacewatch || — || align=right data-sort-value="0.69" | 690 m || 
|-id=772 bgcolor=#fefefe
| 429772 ||  || — || October 16, 2007 || Mount Lemmon || Mount Lemmon Survey || — || align=right data-sort-value="0.58" | 580 m || 
|-id=773 bgcolor=#fefefe
| 429773 ||  || — || September 4, 2010 || Mount Lemmon || Mount Lemmon Survey || — || align=right data-sort-value="0.49" | 490 m || 
|-id=774 bgcolor=#fefefe
| 429774 ||  || — || April 2, 2009 || Kitt Peak || Spacewatch || — || align=right data-sort-value="0.44" | 440 m || 
|-id=775 bgcolor=#fefefe
| 429775 ||  || — || February 2, 2005 || Kitt Peak || Spacewatch || (2076) || align=right data-sort-value="0.76" | 760 m || 
|-id=776 bgcolor=#fefefe
| 429776 ||  || — || February 8, 2008 || Kitt Peak || Spacewatch || — || align=right data-sort-value="0.90" | 900 m || 
|-id=777 bgcolor=#fefefe
| 429777 ||  || — || September 20, 2006 || Catalina || CSS || — || align=right data-sort-value="0.94" | 940 m || 
|-id=778 bgcolor=#fefefe
| 429778 ||  || — || December 14, 2010 || Mount Lemmon || Mount Lemmon Survey || — || align=right data-sort-value="0.88" | 880 m || 
|-id=779 bgcolor=#fefefe
| 429779 ||  || — || September 27, 2000 || Kitt Peak || Spacewatch || — || align=right data-sort-value="0.80" | 800 m || 
|-id=780 bgcolor=#fefefe
| 429780 ||  || — || September 19, 2006 || Kitt Peak || Spacewatch || — || align=right data-sort-value="0.80" | 800 m || 
|-id=781 bgcolor=#fefefe
| 429781 ||  || — || May 6, 2005 || Catalina || CSS || — || align=right data-sort-value="0.82" | 820 m || 
|-id=782 bgcolor=#fefefe
| 429782 ||  || — || April 26, 2001 || Anderson Mesa || LONEOS || — || align=right | 1.1 km || 
|-id=783 bgcolor=#fefefe
| 429783 ||  || — || March 28, 2012 || Kitt Peak || Spacewatch || critical || align=right data-sort-value="0.65" | 650 m || 
|-id=784 bgcolor=#fefefe
| 429784 ||  || — || April 18, 2012 || Kitt Peak || Spacewatch || — || align=right data-sort-value="0.74" | 740 m || 
|-id=785 bgcolor=#fefefe
| 429785 ||  || — || January 10, 2008 || Mount Lemmon || Mount Lemmon Survey || — || align=right data-sort-value="0.81" | 810 m || 
|-id=786 bgcolor=#fefefe
| 429786 ||  || — || June 17, 2009 || Kitt Peak || Spacewatch || — || align=right data-sort-value="0.82" | 820 m || 
|-id=787 bgcolor=#fefefe
| 429787 ||  || — || October 19, 2006 || Kitt Peak || Spacewatch || — || align=right data-sort-value="0.64" | 640 m || 
|-id=788 bgcolor=#fefefe
| 429788 ||  || — || March 10, 2005 || Mount Lemmon || Mount Lemmon Survey || — || align=right data-sort-value="0.65" | 650 m || 
|-id=789 bgcolor=#fefefe
| 429789 ||  || — || March 14, 2012 || Mount Lemmon || Mount Lemmon Survey || — || align=right data-sort-value="0.70" | 700 m || 
|-id=790 bgcolor=#fefefe
| 429790 ||  || — || April 11, 2005 || Kitt Peak || Spacewatch || — || align=right data-sort-value="0.59" | 590 m || 
|-id=791 bgcolor=#fefefe
| 429791 ||  || — || November 6, 2010 || Mount Lemmon || Mount Lemmon Survey || — || align=right data-sort-value="0.55" | 550 m || 
|-id=792 bgcolor=#fefefe
| 429792 ||  || — || February 23, 2012 || Mount Lemmon || Mount Lemmon Survey || — || align=right data-sort-value="0.68" | 680 m || 
|-id=793 bgcolor=#fefefe
| 429793 ||  || — || April 21, 2002 || Kitt Peak || Spacewatch || — || align=right data-sort-value="0.85" | 850 m || 
|-id=794 bgcolor=#fefefe
| 429794 ||  || — || December 17, 2007 || Mount Lemmon || Mount Lemmon Survey || — || align=right data-sort-value="0.88" | 880 m || 
|-id=795 bgcolor=#fefefe
| 429795 ||  || — || March 10, 2005 || Anderson Mesa || LONEOS || — || align=right data-sort-value="0.75" | 750 m || 
|-id=796 bgcolor=#fefefe
| 429796 ||  || — || February 9, 2005 || Kitt Peak || Spacewatch || — || align=right data-sort-value="0.75" | 750 m || 
|-id=797 bgcolor=#fefefe
| 429797 ||  || — || September 25, 2006 || Kitt Peak || Spacewatch || — || align=right data-sort-value="0.65" | 650 m || 
|-id=798 bgcolor=#fefefe
| 429798 ||  || — || December 5, 2007 || Kitt Peak || Spacewatch || — || align=right data-sort-value="0.71" | 710 m || 
|-id=799 bgcolor=#E9E9E9
| 429799 ||  || — || May 1, 2003 || Kitt Peak || Spacewatch || — || align=right | 4.7 km || 
|-id=800 bgcolor=#fefefe
| 429800 ||  || — || March 6, 2008 || Mount Lemmon || Mount Lemmon Survey || — || align=right data-sort-value="0.82" | 820 m || 
|}

429801–429900 

|-bgcolor=#E9E9E9
| 429801 ||  || — || January 26, 2011 || Mount Lemmon || Mount Lemmon Survey || — || align=right | 1.2 km || 
|-id=802 bgcolor=#fefefe
| 429802 ||  || — || February 28, 2008 || Kitt Peak || Spacewatch || — || align=right data-sort-value="0.99" | 990 m || 
|-id=803 bgcolor=#fefefe
| 429803 ||  || — || October 19, 2003 || Kitt Peak || Spacewatch || — || align=right data-sort-value="0.79" | 790 m || 
|-id=804 bgcolor=#E9E9E9
| 429804 ||  || — || October 2, 2005 || Mount Lemmon || Mount Lemmon Survey || — || align=right | 1.7 km || 
|-id=805 bgcolor=#fefefe
| 429805 ||  || — || April 28, 2012 || Mount Lemmon || Mount Lemmon Survey || MAS || align=right data-sort-value="0.75" | 750 m || 
|-id=806 bgcolor=#fefefe
| 429806 ||  || — || December 31, 2007 || Kitt Peak || Spacewatch || — || align=right data-sort-value="0.65" | 650 m || 
|-id=807 bgcolor=#fefefe
| 429807 ||  || — || November 14, 2010 || Mount Lemmon || Mount Lemmon Survey || — || align=right data-sort-value="0.78" | 780 m || 
|-id=808 bgcolor=#fefefe
| 429808 ||  || — || March 6, 2008 || Mount Lemmon || Mount Lemmon Survey || — || align=right | 2.7 km || 
|-id=809 bgcolor=#fefefe
| 429809 ||  || — || December 8, 1996 || Kitt Peak || Spacewatch || — || align=right data-sort-value="0.90" | 900 m || 
|-id=810 bgcolor=#fefefe
| 429810 ||  || — || February 9, 2008 || Kitt Peak || Spacewatch || — || align=right data-sort-value="0.65" | 650 m || 
|-id=811 bgcolor=#fefefe
| 429811 ||  || — || May 8, 2005 || Mount Lemmon || Mount Lemmon Survey || — || align=right data-sort-value="0.64" | 640 m || 
|-id=812 bgcolor=#fefefe
| 429812 ||  || — || December 4, 2007 || Mount Lemmon || Mount Lemmon Survey || — || align=right data-sort-value="0.61" | 610 m || 
|-id=813 bgcolor=#fefefe
| 429813 ||  || — || March 29, 2012 || Kitt Peak || Spacewatch || — || align=right data-sort-value="0.80" | 800 m || 
|-id=814 bgcolor=#fefefe
| 429814 ||  || — || November 27, 2010 || Mount Lemmon || Mount Lemmon Survey || — || align=right data-sort-value="0.83" | 830 m || 
|-id=815 bgcolor=#E9E9E9
| 429815 ||  || — || May 5, 2008 || Mount Lemmon || Mount Lemmon Survey || — || align=right | 1.0 km || 
|-id=816 bgcolor=#fefefe
| 429816 ||  || — || February 28, 2008 || Kitt Peak || Spacewatch || — || align=right data-sort-value="0.75" | 750 m || 
|-id=817 bgcolor=#E9E9E9
| 429817 ||  || — || May 28, 2008 || Mount Lemmon || Mount Lemmon Survey || (5) || align=right data-sort-value="0.69" | 690 m || 
|-id=818 bgcolor=#fefefe
| 429818 ||  || — || July 3, 2005 || Mount Lemmon || Mount Lemmon Survey || — || align=right data-sort-value="0.68" | 680 m || 
|-id=819 bgcolor=#fefefe
| 429819 ||  || — || May 21, 2012 || Mount Lemmon || Mount Lemmon Survey || — || align=right data-sort-value="0.83" | 830 m || 
|-id=820 bgcolor=#fefefe
| 429820 ||  || — || October 22, 2003 || Kitt Peak || Spacewatch || — || align=right data-sort-value="0.70" | 700 m || 
|-id=821 bgcolor=#fefefe
| 429821 ||  || — || February 18, 2008 || Mount Lemmon || Mount Lemmon Survey || — || align=right data-sort-value="0.76" | 760 m || 
|-id=822 bgcolor=#E9E9E9
| 429822 ||  || — || January 13, 2011 || Kitt Peak || Spacewatch || — || align=right | 1.1 km || 
|-id=823 bgcolor=#E9E9E9
| 429823 ||  || — || November 24, 1997 || Kitt Peak || Spacewatch || — || align=right | 1.4 km || 
|-id=824 bgcolor=#E9E9E9
| 429824 ||  || — || May 30, 2012 || Mount Lemmon || Mount Lemmon Survey || — || align=right | 1.4 km || 
|-id=825 bgcolor=#E9E9E9
| 429825 ||  || — || December 18, 2009 || Kitt Peak || Spacewatch || — || align=right | 1.9 km || 
|-id=826 bgcolor=#d6d6d6
| 429826 ||  || — || December 5, 2008 || Mount Lemmon || Mount Lemmon Survey || — || align=right | 4.1 km || 
|-id=827 bgcolor=#E9E9E9
| 429827 ||  || — || September 19, 2003 || Kitt Peak || Spacewatch || — || align=right | 2.8 km || 
|-id=828 bgcolor=#d6d6d6
| 429828 ||  || — || September 10, 2007 || Kitt Peak || Spacewatch || — || align=right | 2.9 km || 
|-id=829 bgcolor=#E9E9E9
| 429829 ||  || — || September 5, 2008 || Kitt Peak || Spacewatch || — || align=right | 1.5 km || 
|-id=830 bgcolor=#d6d6d6
| 429830 ||  || — || December 18, 2003 || Kitt Peak || Spacewatch || EOS || align=right | 2.1 km || 
|-id=831 bgcolor=#d6d6d6
| 429831 ||  || — || May 30, 2006 || Mount Lemmon || Mount Lemmon Survey || — || align=right | 2.8 km || 
|-id=832 bgcolor=#E9E9E9
| 429832 ||  || — || January 26, 2006 || Mount Lemmon || Mount Lemmon Survey || — || align=right | 1.7 km || 
|-id=833 bgcolor=#fefefe
| 429833 ||  || — || January 30, 2011 || Mount Lemmon || Mount Lemmon Survey || — || align=right | 1.2 km || 
|-id=834 bgcolor=#d6d6d6
| 429834 ||  || — || November 20, 2008 || Kitt Peak || Spacewatch || EOS || align=right | 2.2 km || 
|-id=835 bgcolor=#E9E9E9
| 429835 ||  || — || December 20, 2009 || Mount Lemmon || Mount Lemmon Survey || — || align=right | 2.5 km || 
|-id=836 bgcolor=#d6d6d6
| 429836 ||  || — || December 22, 2008 || Mount Lemmon || Mount Lemmon Survey || — || align=right | 2.6 km || 
|-id=837 bgcolor=#E9E9E9
| 429837 ||  || — || January 9, 2011 || Mount Lemmon || Mount Lemmon Survey || — || align=right | 1.8 km || 
|-id=838 bgcolor=#d6d6d6
| 429838 ||  || — || October 9, 2007 || Mount Lemmon || Mount Lemmon Survey || — || align=right | 2.4 km || 
|-id=839 bgcolor=#E9E9E9
| 429839 ||  || — || February 25, 2011 || Kitt Peak || Spacewatch || — || align=right | 2.1 km || 
|-id=840 bgcolor=#d6d6d6
| 429840 ||  || — || August 24, 2001 || Kitt Peak || Spacewatch || — || align=right | 2.5 km || 
|-id=841 bgcolor=#E9E9E9
| 429841 ||  || — || February 15, 2010 || Mount Lemmon || Mount Lemmon Survey || — || align=right | 2.0 km || 
|-id=842 bgcolor=#d6d6d6
| 429842 ||  || — || August 25, 2012 || Kitt Peak || Spacewatch || — || align=right | 3.6 km || 
|-id=843 bgcolor=#d6d6d6
| 429843 ||  || — || March 13, 2010 || Kitt Peak || Spacewatch || — || align=right | 3.3 km || 
|-id=844 bgcolor=#E9E9E9
| 429844 ||  || — || September 29, 1994 || Kitt Peak || Spacewatch || — || align=right | 2.4 km || 
|-id=845 bgcolor=#FA8072
| 429845 ||  || — || April 25, 2004 || Socorro || LINEAR || — || align=right | 1.1 km || 
|-id=846 bgcolor=#d6d6d6
| 429846 ||  || — || March 24, 2006 || Catalina || CSS || BRA || align=right | 2.0 km || 
|-id=847 bgcolor=#fefefe
| 429847 ||  || — || October 30, 2005 || Kitt Peak || Spacewatch || V || align=right data-sort-value="0.70" | 700 m || 
|-id=848 bgcolor=#E9E9E9
| 429848 ||  || — || October 25, 2008 || Kitt Peak || Spacewatch || — || align=right | 3.4 km || 
|-id=849 bgcolor=#d6d6d6
| 429849 ||  || — || June 10, 2010 || WISE || WISE || — || align=right | 3.4 km || 
|-id=850 bgcolor=#E9E9E9
| 429850 ||  || — || October 28, 2008 || Kitt Peak || Spacewatch || — || align=right | 2.0 km || 
|-id=851 bgcolor=#d6d6d6
| 429851 ||  || — || September 5, 2007 || Mount Lemmon || Mount Lemmon Survey ||  || align=right | 2.6 km || 
|-id=852 bgcolor=#E9E9E9
| 429852 ||  || — || January 23, 2006 || Kitt Peak || Spacewatch || EUN || align=right | 1.5 km || 
|-id=853 bgcolor=#d6d6d6
| 429853 ||  || — || August 28, 2006 || Kitt Peak || Spacewatch || — || align=right | 3.1 km || 
|-id=854 bgcolor=#E9E9E9
| 429854 ||  || — || September 22, 2003 || Kitt Peak || Spacewatch || HOF || align=right | 2.5 km || 
|-id=855 bgcolor=#d6d6d6
| 429855 ||  || — || September 13, 1996 || Kitt Peak || Spacewatch || — || align=right | 2.6 km || 
|-id=856 bgcolor=#d6d6d6
| 429856 ||  || — || December 2, 2008 || Kitt Peak || Spacewatch || — || align=right | 2.7 km || 
|-id=857 bgcolor=#E9E9E9
| 429857 ||  || — || September 24, 2008 || Kitt Peak || Spacewatch || — || align=right | 1.8 km || 
|-id=858 bgcolor=#d6d6d6
| 429858 ||  || — || February 28, 2009 || Mount Lemmon || Mount Lemmon Survey || — || align=right | 3.2 km || 
|-id=859 bgcolor=#d6d6d6
| 429859 ||  || — || February 1, 2009 || Mount Lemmon || Mount Lemmon Survey || — || align=right | 3.2 km || 
|-id=860 bgcolor=#fefefe
| 429860 ||  || — || June 15, 2004 || Siding Spring || SSS || — || align=right | 1.1 km || 
|-id=861 bgcolor=#d6d6d6
| 429861 ||  || — || November 2, 2007 || Mount Lemmon || Mount Lemmon Survey || — || align=right | 4.1 km || 
|-id=862 bgcolor=#C2FFFF
| 429862 ||  || — || January 13, 2005 || Socorro || LINEAR || L5 || align=right | 15 km || 
|-id=863 bgcolor=#d6d6d6
| 429863 ||  || — || November 9, 2007 || Mount Lemmon || Mount Lemmon Survey || — || align=right | 2.9 km || 
|-id=864 bgcolor=#C2FFFF
| 429864 ||  || — || September 19, 2012 || Mount Lemmon || Mount Lemmon Survey || L4 || align=right | 9.4 km || 
|-id=865 bgcolor=#d6d6d6
| 429865 ||  || — || August 10, 2007 || Kitt Peak || Spacewatch || KOR || align=right | 1.2 km || 
|-id=866 bgcolor=#d6d6d6
| 429866 ||  || — || September 17, 2012 || Kitt Peak || Spacewatch || — || align=right | 2.8 km || 
|-id=867 bgcolor=#d6d6d6
| 429867 ||  || — || September 15, 2006 || Kitt Peak || Spacewatch || ELF || align=right | 3.9 km || 
|-id=868 bgcolor=#d6d6d6
| 429868 ||  || — || November 8, 2007 || Socorro || LINEAR || EOS || align=right | 2.5 km || 
|-id=869 bgcolor=#d6d6d6
| 429869 ||  || — || January 17, 2010 || WISE || WISE || — || align=right | 3.5 km || 
|-id=870 bgcolor=#d6d6d6
| 429870 ||  || — || February 14, 2004 || Kitt Peak || Spacewatch || EOS || align=right | 2.4 km || 
|-id=871 bgcolor=#d6d6d6
| 429871 ||  || — || October 14, 2001 || Socorro || LINEAR || VER || align=right | 3.7 km || 
|-id=872 bgcolor=#d6d6d6
| 429872 ||  || — || March 15, 2010 || Kitt Peak || Spacewatch || — || align=right | 2.8 km || 
|-id=873 bgcolor=#d6d6d6
| 429873 ||  || — || April 7, 2005 || Kitt Peak || Spacewatch || — || align=right | 3.3 km || 
|-id=874 bgcolor=#d6d6d6
| 429874 ||  || — || February 18, 2010 || Mount Lemmon || Mount Lemmon Survey || — || align=right | 2.8 km || 
|-id=875 bgcolor=#E9E9E9
| 429875 ||  || — || September 21, 2008 || Kitt Peak || Spacewatch || — || align=right data-sort-value="0.92" | 920 m || 
|-id=876 bgcolor=#d6d6d6
| 429876 ||  || — || September 15, 2007 || Mount Lemmon || Mount Lemmon Survey || — || align=right | 2.9 km || 
|-id=877 bgcolor=#E9E9E9
| 429877 ||  || — || March 1, 2011 || Mount Lemmon || Mount Lemmon Survey || EUN || align=right data-sort-value="0.99" | 990 m || 
|-id=878 bgcolor=#d6d6d6
| 429878 ||  || — || January 28, 2000 || Kitt Peak || Spacewatch || — || align=right | 2.6 km || 
|-id=879 bgcolor=#d6d6d6
| 429879 ||  || — || September 13, 2007 || Kitt Peak || Spacewatch || — || align=right | 3.4 km || 
|-id=880 bgcolor=#d6d6d6
| 429880 ||  || — || February 3, 2009 || Kitt Peak || Spacewatch || — || align=right | 2.8 km || 
|-id=881 bgcolor=#d6d6d6
| 429881 ||  || — || September 16, 2012 || Mount Lemmon || Mount Lemmon Survey || — || align=right | 2.7 km || 
|-id=882 bgcolor=#d6d6d6
| 429882 ||  || — || May 14, 2005 || Mount Lemmon || Mount Lemmon Survey || EOS || align=right | 1.8 km || 
|-id=883 bgcolor=#d6d6d6
| 429883 ||  || — || March 3, 2009 || Kitt Peak || Spacewatch || 7:4 || align=right | 3.5 km || 
|-id=884 bgcolor=#E9E9E9
| 429884 ||  || — || September 26, 2003 || Socorro || LINEAR || — || align=right | 2.3 km || 
|-id=885 bgcolor=#d6d6d6
| 429885 ||  || — || September 15, 2007 || Mount Lemmon || Mount Lemmon Survey || EOS || align=right | 1.8 km || 
|-id=886 bgcolor=#d6d6d6
| 429886 ||  || — || October 12, 2004 || Kitt Peak || Spacewatch || SHU3:2 || align=right | 5.1 km || 
|-id=887 bgcolor=#d6d6d6
| 429887 ||  || — || October 14, 2007 || Kitt Peak || Spacewatch || — || align=right | 2.6 km || 
|-id=888 bgcolor=#E9E9E9
| 429888 ||  || — || September 20, 2008 || Kitt Peak || Spacewatch || MAR || align=right | 1.1 km || 
|-id=889 bgcolor=#d6d6d6
| 429889 ||  || — || January 25, 2009 || Kitt Peak || Spacewatch || — || align=right | 2.7 km || 
|-id=890 bgcolor=#d6d6d6
| 429890 ||  || — || November 4, 2007 || Mount Lemmon || Mount Lemmon Survey || EOS || align=right | 2.0 km || 
|-id=891 bgcolor=#d6d6d6
| 429891 ||  || — || October 15, 2001 || Kitt Peak || Spacewatch || — || align=right | 3.0 km || 
|-id=892 bgcolor=#d6d6d6
| 429892 ||  || — || September 9, 2007 || Kitt Peak || Spacewatch || BRA || align=right | 1.3 km || 
|-id=893 bgcolor=#d6d6d6
| 429893 ||  || — || April 11, 2005 || Mount Lemmon || Mount Lemmon Survey || HYG || align=right | 2.9 km || 
|-id=894 bgcolor=#E9E9E9
| 429894 ||  || — || May 6, 2006 || Mount Lemmon || Mount Lemmon Survey || — || align=right | 2.8 km || 
|-id=895 bgcolor=#E9E9E9
| 429895 ||  || — || March 12, 2011 || Siding Spring || SSS || — || align=right | 2.5 km || 
|-id=896 bgcolor=#d6d6d6
| 429896 ||  || — || April 11, 2010 || Mount Lemmon || Mount Lemmon Survey || — || align=right | 2.7 km || 
|-id=897 bgcolor=#d6d6d6
| 429897 ||  || — || November 2, 2007 || Kitt Peak || Spacewatch || — || align=right | 3.1 km || 
|-id=898 bgcolor=#d6d6d6
| 429898 ||  || — || December 5, 2008 || Kitt Peak || Spacewatch || KOR || align=right | 1.8 km || 
|-id=899 bgcolor=#E9E9E9
| 429899 ||  || — || September 3, 2007 || Catalina || CSS || — || align=right | 2.7 km || 
|-id=900 bgcolor=#E9E9E9
| 429900 ||  || — || April 22, 2007 || Catalina || CSS || JUN || align=right data-sort-value="0.97" | 970 m || 
|}

429901–430000 

|-bgcolor=#d6d6d6
| 429901 ||  || — || October 20, 2006 || Kitt Peak || Spacewatch || — || align=right | 3.1 km || 
|-id=902 bgcolor=#E9E9E9
| 429902 ||  || — || March 14, 2011 || Mount Lemmon || Mount Lemmon Survey || — || align=right | 1.5 km || 
|-id=903 bgcolor=#d6d6d6
| 429903 ||  || — || September 19, 2006 || Catalina || CSS || — || align=right | 5.6 km || 
|-id=904 bgcolor=#d6d6d6
| 429904 ||  || — || April 10, 2010 || Mount Lemmon || Mount Lemmon Survey || — || align=right | 2.9 km || 
|-id=905 bgcolor=#E9E9E9
| 429905 ||  || — || April 5, 1994 || Kitt Peak || Spacewatch || — || align=right | 1.1 km || 
|-id=906 bgcolor=#d6d6d6
| 429906 ||  || — || March 16, 2010 || Mount Lemmon || Mount Lemmon Survey || — || align=right | 3.2 km || 
|-id=907 bgcolor=#E9E9E9
| 429907 ||  || — || October 19, 1995 || Kitt Peak || Spacewatch || — || align=right | 1.6 km || 
|-id=908 bgcolor=#d6d6d6
| 429908 ||  || — || October 21, 2007 || Mount Lemmon || Mount Lemmon Survey || — || align=right | 3.3 km || 
|-id=909 bgcolor=#d6d6d6
| 429909 ||  || — || November 7, 2007 || Kitt Peak || Spacewatch || — || align=right | 3.5 km || 
|-id=910 bgcolor=#d6d6d6
| 429910 ||  || — || February 1, 2009 || Mount Lemmon || Mount Lemmon Survey || — || align=right | 2.6 km || 
|-id=911 bgcolor=#d6d6d6
| 429911 ||  || — || August 19, 2006 || Kitt Peak || Spacewatch || — || align=right | 2.3 km || 
|-id=912 bgcolor=#d6d6d6
| 429912 ||  || — || April 5, 2005 || Mount Lemmon || Mount Lemmon Survey || THM || align=right | 2.3 km || 
|-id=913 bgcolor=#d6d6d6
| 429913 ||  || — || September 14, 2007 || Mount Lemmon || Mount Lemmon Survey || — || align=right | 2.4 km || 
|-id=914 bgcolor=#d6d6d6
| 429914 ||  || — || November 9, 2007 || Kitt Peak || Spacewatch || — || align=right | 3.0 km || 
|-id=915 bgcolor=#E9E9E9
| 429915 ||  || — || April 15, 2007 || Kitt Peak || Spacewatch || — || align=right | 1.2 km || 
|-id=916 bgcolor=#d6d6d6
| 429916 ||  || — || April 17, 2005 || Kitt Peak || Spacewatch || — || align=right | 2.6 km || 
|-id=917 bgcolor=#E9E9E9
| 429917 ||  || — || September 9, 2004 || Kitt Peak || Spacewatch || — || align=right data-sort-value="0.98" | 980 m || 
|-id=918 bgcolor=#d6d6d6
| 429918 ||  || — || November 4, 2007 || Mount Lemmon || Mount Lemmon Survey || EOS || align=right | 1.9 km || 
|-id=919 bgcolor=#d6d6d6
| 429919 ||  || — || January 18, 2009 || XuYi || PMO NEO || EOS || align=right | 2.2 km || 
|-id=920 bgcolor=#d6d6d6
| 429920 ||  || — || November 1, 2005 || Mount Lemmon || Mount Lemmon Survey || 3:2 || align=right | 3.4 km || 
|-id=921 bgcolor=#d6d6d6
| 429921 ||  || — || September 15, 2012 || Catalina || CSS || — || align=right | 3.0 km || 
|-id=922 bgcolor=#d6d6d6
| 429922 ||  || — || September 15, 2006 || Kitt Peak || Spacewatch || — || align=right | 3.2 km || 
|-id=923 bgcolor=#d6d6d6
| 429923 ||  || — || November 14, 2007 || Kitt Peak || Spacewatch || — || align=right | 2.4 km || 
|-id=924 bgcolor=#d6d6d6
| 429924 ||  || — || November 4, 2007 || Kitt Peak || Spacewatch || — || align=right | 2.7 km || 
|-id=925 bgcolor=#d6d6d6
| 429925 ||  || — || September 28, 2006 || Kitt Peak || Spacewatch || VER || align=right | 3.0 km || 
|-id=926 bgcolor=#d6d6d6
| 429926 ||  || — || September 12, 2007 || Anderson Mesa || LONEOS || — || align=right | 2.5 km || 
|-id=927 bgcolor=#d6d6d6
| 429927 ||  || — || March 18, 2004 || Kitt Peak || Spacewatch || — || align=right | 3.1 km || 
|-id=928 bgcolor=#d6d6d6
| 429928 ||  || — || May 13, 2005 || Kitt Peak || Spacewatch || EOS || align=right | 1.9 km || 
|-id=929 bgcolor=#d6d6d6
| 429929 ||  || — || February 2, 2009 || Kitt Peak || Spacewatch || HYG || align=right | 2.5 km || 
|-id=930 bgcolor=#d6d6d6
| 429930 ||  || — || August 28, 2006 || Kitt Peak || Spacewatch || — || align=right | 2.5 km || 
|-id=931 bgcolor=#d6d6d6
| 429931 ||  || — || March 17, 2004 || Kitt Peak || Spacewatch || — || align=right | 3.5 km || 
|-id=932 bgcolor=#d6d6d6
| 429932 ||  || — || November 18, 2001 || Kitt Peak || Spacewatch || — || align=right | 4.1 km || 
|-id=933 bgcolor=#d6d6d6
| 429933 ||  || — || December 29, 2008 || Mount Lemmon || Mount Lemmon Survey || — || align=right | 3.0 km || 
|-id=934 bgcolor=#d6d6d6
| 429934 ||  || — || October 7, 2004 || Kitt Peak || Spacewatch || 3:2 || align=right | 4.2 km || 
|-id=935 bgcolor=#d6d6d6
| 429935 ||  || — || January 1, 2009 || Mount Lemmon || Mount Lemmon Survey || — || align=right | 3.0 km || 
|-id=936 bgcolor=#d6d6d6
| 429936 ||  || — || October 20, 2006 || Mount Lemmon || Mount Lemmon Survey || 7:4 || align=right | 3.7 km || 
|-id=937 bgcolor=#d6d6d6
| 429937 ||  || — || September 16, 2006 || Anderson Mesa || LONEOS || — || align=right | 3.1 km || 
|-id=938 bgcolor=#d6d6d6
| 429938 ||  || — || January 20, 2009 || Mount Lemmon || Mount Lemmon Survey || VER || align=right | 4.8 km || 
|-id=939 bgcolor=#d6d6d6
| 429939 ||  || — || August 27, 2006 || Kitt Peak || Spacewatch || — || align=right | 3.9 km || 
|-id=940 bgcolor=#d6d6d6
| 429940 ||  || — || September 19, 1995 || Kitt Peak || Spacewatch || — || align=right | 3.2 km || 
|-id=941 bgcolor=#fefefe
| 429941 ||  || — || June 7, 2008 || Catalina || CSS || — || align=right | 3.2 km || 
|-id=942 bgcolor=#d6d6d6
| 429942 ||  || — || October 6, 2007 || Kitt Peak || Spacewatch || — || align=right | 3.5 km || 
|-id=943 bgcolor=#E9E9E9
| 429943 ||  || — || October 2, 1991 || Kitt Peak || Spacewatch || — || align=right | 1.3 km || 
|-id=944 bgcolor=#d6d6d6
| 429944 ||  || — || February 14, 2010 || Kitt Peak || Spacewatch || — || align=right | 2.7 km || 
|-id=945 bgcolor=#d6d6d6
| 429945 ||  || — || April 7, 2005 || Kitt Peak || Spacewatch || EOS || align=right | 1.8 km || 
|-id=946 bgcolor=#E9E9E9
| 429946 ||  || — || November 2, 2008 || Kitt Peak || Spacewatch || — || align=right | 1.5 km || 
|-id=947 bgcolor=#d6d6d6
| 429947 ||  || — || August 18, 2006 || Kitt Peak || Spacewatch || EOS || align=right | 2.1 km || 
|-id=948 bgcolor=#d6d6d6
| 429948 ||  || — || February 22, 2009 || Kitt Peak || Spacewatch || — || align=right | 3.4 km || 
|-id=949 bgcolor=#E9E9E9
| 429949 ||  || — || February 14, 2010 || Mount Lemmon || Mount Lemmon Survey || — || align=right | 1.4 km || 
|-id=950 bgcolor=#d6d6d6
| 429950 ||  || — || April 10, 2010 || Mount Lemmon || Mount Lemmon Survey || — || align=right | 3.2 km || 
|-id=951 bgcolor=#d6d6d6
| 429951 ||  || — || November 11, 2006 || Kitt Peak || Spacewatch || 7:4 || align=right | 4.1 km || 
|-id=952 bgcolor=#d6d6d6
| 429952 ||  || — || September 15, 2006 || Kitt Peak || Spacewatch || — || align=right | 3.8 km || 
|-id=953 bgcolor=#d6d6d6
| 429953 ||  || — || September 14, 2006 || Catalina || CSS || — || align=right | 3.2 km || 
|-id=954 bgcolor=#d6d6d6
| 429954 ||  || — || October 10, 2012 || Mount Lemmon || Mount Lemmon Survey || — || align=right | 2.6 km || 
|-id=955 bgcolor=#d6d6d6
| 429955 ||  || — || September 20, 2001 || Socorro || LINEAR || — || align=right | 3.0 km || 
|-id=956 bgcolor=#d6d6d6
| 429956 ||  || — || November 1, 2007 || Kitt Peak || Spacewatch || — || align=right | 3.7 km || 
|-id=957 bgcolor=#d6d6d6
| 429957 ||  || — || October 8, 2012 || Mount Lemmon || Mount Lemmon Survey || 3:2 || align=right | 3.7 km || 
|-id=958 bgcolor=#d6d6d6
| 429958 ||  || — || November 20, 2007 || Kitt Peak || Spacewatch || — || align=right | 4.1 km || 
|-id=959 bgcolor=#E9E9E9
| 429959 ||  || — || September 16, 2003 || Kitt Peak || Spacewatch || — || align=right | 1.5 km || 
|-id=960 bgcolor=#d6d6d6
| 429960 ||  || — || February 11, 2010 || WISE || WISE || — || align=right | 3.8 km || 
|-id=961 bgcolor=#d6d6d6
| 429961 ||  || — || September 19, 2006 || Kitt Peak || Spacewatch || VER || align=right | 2.7 km || 
|-id=962 bgcolor=#d6d6d6
| 429962 ||  || — || May 7, 2010 || Mount Lemmon || Mount Lemmon Survey || — || align=right | 3.3 km || 
|-id=963 bgcolor=#d6d6d6
| 429963 ||  || — || November 5, 2007 || Kitt Peak || Spacewatch || — || align=right | 3.1 km || 
|-id=964 bgcolor=#d6d6d6
| 429964 ||  || — || October 11, 2007 || Kitt Peak || Spacewatch || EOS || align=right | 1.8 km || 
|-id=965 bgcolor=#d6d6d6
| 429965 ||  || — || April 10, 2010 || Kitt Peak || Spacewatch || — || align=right | 2.8 km || 
|-id=966 bgcolor=#d6d6d6
| 429966 ||  || — || November 12, 2012 || Mount Lemmon || Mount Lemmon Survey || 3:2 || align=right | 4.3 km || 
|-id=967 bgcolor=#fefefe
| 429967 ||  || — || December 2, 2005 || Kitt Peak || Spacewatch || — || align=right data-sort-value="0.94" | 940 m || 
|-id=968 bgcolor=#d6d6d6
| 429968 ||  || — || February 2, 2009 || Mount Lemmon || Mount Lemmon Survey || EOS || align=right | 2.4 km || 
|-id=969 bgcolor=#C2FFFF
| 429969 ||  || — || September 9, 2008 || Mount Lemmon || Mount Lemmon Survey || L4 || align=right | 9.8 km || 
|-id=970 bgcolor=#C2FFFF
| 429970 ||  || — || July 3, 1995 || Kitt Peak || Spacewatch || L4 || align=right | 8.9 km || 
|-id=971 bgcolor=#d6d6d6
| 429971 ||  || — || September 27, 2006 || Catalina || CSS || Tj (2.95) || align=right | 4.8 km || 
|-id=972 bgcolor=#d6d6d6
| 429972 ||  || — || July 25, 2010 || WISE || WISE || — || align=right | 5.3 km || 
|-id=973 bgcolor=#C2FFFF
| 429973 ||  || — || September 18, 2009 || Kitt Peak || Spacewatch || L4 || align=right | 7.8 km || 
|-id=974 bgcolor=#C2FFFF
| 429974 ||  || — || February 20, 2002 || Kitt Peak || Spacewatch || L4 || align=right | 8.0 km || 
|-id=975 bgcolor=#C2FFFF
| 429975 ||  || — || January 10, 2013 || Kitt Peak || Spacewatch || L4 || align=right | 12 km || 
|-id=976 bgcolor=#FA8072
| 429976 ||  || — || November 20, 2006 || Kitt Peak || Spacewatch || H || align=right data-sort-value="0.68" | 680 m || 
|-id=977 bgcolor=#fefefe
| 429977 ||  || — || January 11, 2010 || Kitt Peak || Spacewatch || H || align=right data-sort-value="0.70" | 700 m || 
|-id=978 bgcolor=#fefefe
| 429978 ||  || — || November 3, 2007 || Mount Lemmon || Mount Lemmon Survey || — || align=right data-sort-value="0.92" | 920 m || 
|-id=979 bgcolor=#fefefe
| 429979 ||  || — || March 16, 2007 || Catalina || CSS || H || align=right data-sort-value="0.65" | 650 m || 
|-id=980 bgcolor=#fefefe
| 429980 ||  || — || December 4, 2010 || Mount Lemmon || Mount Lemmon Survey || — || align=right data-sort-value="0.67" | 670 m || 
|-id=981 bgcolor=#fefefe
| 429981 ||  || — || December 26, 2006 || Kitt Peak || Spacewatch || H || align=right data-sort-value="0.68" | 680 m || 
|-id=982 bgcolor=#fefefe
| 429982 ||  || — || December 9, 2006 || Kitt Peak || Spacewatch || — || align=right | 1.1 km || 
|-id=983 bgcolor=#fefefe
| 429983 ||  || — || December 7, 1999 || Kitt Peak || Spacewatch || MAS || align=right data-sort-value="0.69" | 690 m || 
|-id=984 bgcolor=#fefefe
| 429984 ||  || — || September 23, 2000 || Socorro || LINEAR || H || align=right | 1.0 km || 
|-id=985 bgcolor=#fefefe
| 429985 ||  || — || February 21, 2012 || Kitt Peak || Spacewatch || — || align=right data-sort-value="0.63" | 630 m || 
|-id=986 bgcolor=#E9E9E9
| 429986 ||  || — || January 2, 2011 || Mount Lemmon || Mount Lemmon Survey || EUN || align=right | 1.2 km || 
|-id=987 bgcolor=#E9E9E9
| 429987 ||  || — || September 29, 2009 || Mount Lemmon || Mount Lemmon Survey || — || align=right | 1.5 km || 
|-id=988 bgcolor=#fefefe
| 429988 ||  || — || October 1, 2003 || Anderson Mesa || LONEOS || — || align=right data-sort-value="0.81" | 810 m || 
|-id=989 bgcolor=#E9E9E9
| 429989 ||  || — || November 3, 2005 || Mount Lemmon || Mount Lemmon Survey || — || align=right | 1.3 km || 
|-id=990 bgcolor=#fefefe
| 429990 ||  || — || November 2, 2006 || Mount Lemmon || Mount Lemmon Survey || — || align=right | 1.1 km || 
|-id=991 bgcolor=#fefefe
| 429991 ||  || — || October 31, 2010 || Kitt Peak || Spacewatch || — || align=right data-sort-value="0.68" | 680 m || 
|-id=992 bgcolor=#fefefe
| 429992 ||  || — || June 18, 2005 || Mount Lemmon || Mount Lemmon Survey || — || align=right | 1.2 km || 
|-id=993 bgcolor=#E9E9E9
| 429993 ||  || — || December 4, 2005 || Mount Lemmon || Mount Lemmon Survey || MIS || align=right | 1.8 km || 
|-id=994 bgcolor=#E9E9E9
| 429994 ||  || — || November 9, 2009 || Catalina || CSS || — || align=right | 2.2 km || 
|-id=995 bgcolor=#fefefe
| 429995 ||  || — || September 26, 2006 || Mount Lemmon || Mount Lemmon Survey || — || align=right data-sort-value="0.77" | 770 m || 
|-id=996 bgcolor=#E9E9E9
| 429996 ||  || — || November 26, 2009 || Mount Lemmon || Mount Lemmon Survey || — || align=right | 1.5 km || 
|-id=997 bgcolor=#d6d6d6
| 429997 ||  || — || February 14, 2010 || Mount Lemmon || Mount Lemmon Survey || — || align=right | 3.0 km || 
|-id=998 bgcolor=#E9E9E9
| 429998 ||  || — || December 13, 2010 || Mount Lemmon || Mount Lemmon Survey || — || align=right | 1.8 km || 
|-id=999 bgcolor=#E9E9E9
| 429999 ||  || — || August 17, 2009 || Catalina || CSS || EUN || align=right | 1.3 km || 
|-id=000 bgcolor=#E9E9E9
| 430000 ||  || — || October 27, 2009 || Mount Lemmon || Mount Lemmon Survey || — || align=right | 1.6 km || 
|}

References

External links 
 Discovery Circumstances: Numbered Minor Planets (425001)–(430000) (IAU Minor Planet Center)

0429